= TMU Bold men's basketball =

- University: Toronto Metropolitan University
- First season: 1949–50; 77 years ago
- History: Ryerson Rams (1949–2022)
- Head coach: David DeAveiro
- Location: Toronto, Ontario
- Arena: Mattamy Athletic Centre (capacity: 1,000)
- Conference: Ontario University Athletics; OUA Central Division
- Nickname: Bold
- Colors: Blue and gold

U Sports tournament appearances
- 1999, 2012, 2015, 2016, 2017, 2018, 2019, 2026

Conference tournament champions
- 2016, 2017, 2026

Conference regular-season champions
- 2016

Conference division champions
- 2000, 2015, 2016, 2017

Uniforms
Home	Away

The TMU Bold men's basketball team (formerly the Ryerson Rams) represents Toronto Metropolitan University in U Sports men's basketball. The team has been active since 1949, and currently compete in the Ontario University Athletics (OUA) conference of U Sports, playing in the OUA Central Division. The team plays its home games at the Mattamy Athletic Centre in Toronto, Ontario.

== History ==
The Ryerson Rams first fielded a men's basketball team in 1949, shortly after fielding a hockey team the year prior. The Rams' first coach was A.E. Toogood. Unfortunately, most of the records from this time are lost, so not much is known about his performance as a coach. In his final year of coaching, he had an 11–8 record. After Toogood's departure, all the Rams teams joined the Ontario Intercollegiate Athletic Association (OIAA), where they played against other collegiate teams. The Rams' first coach under the OIAA was Bruce Forsythe. The Rams struggled during these early years, with the 1960–61 season seeing them hold a 1–7 record. Records for this time are still lost, so not much is known about the other seasons played under the OIAA. In 1971, the intercollegiate leagues of Ontario and Quebec were consolidated, which saw the Rams move from the OIAA to the larger Ontario University Athletic Association (OUAA), which kept better records of their seasons. The team's first coach under the OUAA was Ed DeArmon, and by the end of his tenure in 1979, he had posted a 12–92 record. Terry Haggerty took over as head coach in 1981, and lead to the Rams' first ever postseason appearance in 1987, where they won the consolation finals against the York Yeomen. Following this, Haggerty led the Rams to ten straight playoff appearances, including one national appearance in 1999, where they were eliminated in the consolation semifinals by the Bishop's Gaiters. This run also saw the Rams winning the OUAA East Division in the regular season in 1999–2000. Haggerty was hired as the university's sports manager, and was replaced by Patrick Williams as coach. Williams struggled, however, and was soon fired in favour of Glen Taylor in 2005. Haggerty would remain in his position as sports manager until he was fired in 2007, after working in the athletic department for 26 years.

Following Taylor's tenure as coach, the Rams hired Roy Rana, who had previously coached high school basketball teams. Rana's Rams quickly rose to becoming serious contenders, and a CIS powerhouse. The team saw their most productive run under his coaching, making the playoffs every year that he was coach. The Rams made it back to the national championship in 2012, after 13 years, which saw them lose the consolation finals to the Acadia Axemen. The 2014–15 season saw the Rams win their bid to host the 2015 CIS Final 8 championship. at which the team took home their first national bronze medal in program history. Rana took a sabbatical leave in 2015, and so Patrick Tatham took over as head coach in the interim. That season saw the Rams win the OUA conference in the regular season, and brought them to their first Wilson Cup, and second straight CIS Bronze medal. The Rams had also achieved the number one spot on the CIS's weekly rankings for the first time in the program's history, and Ammanuel Diressa, a guard on the team, had been named CIS male athlete of the week. Tatham's performance during this season made him favoured to win the CIS coach of the year award. The year Rana came back, the Rams won the East Division again, and won back-to-back Wilson Cups, as well as being the runner-up to the national championship, losing to the Carleton Ravens. The next two seasons saw the Rams make it to the Wilson Cup finals, losing both times, while they were the runner-ups again in the national championships, coming home with a bronze medal in the 2018–19 season. Following this run of success, which saw a total of six nationals appearances, Rana left the Rams to accept a position as assistant coach to the Sacramento Kings in the NBA at the end of the 2018–19 season. The 2019–20 season saw Borko Popic coaching on an interim basis, leading the Rams to 2nd in the OUA Central Division, and losing in the quarterfinals of the Wilson Cup to the Ottawa Gee-Gees. The 2020–21 season was cancelled due to the COVID-19 pandemic, and when play resumed for the 2021–22 season, the Rams had selected David DeAveiro as the new head coach. DeAveiro had previously served as head coach of the McGill Redbirds men's basketball team. The university changed its name in 2022, and the team name changed to the TMU Bold.

== Season-by-season results ==
The TMU Bold men's basketball team hosting the Windsor Lancers men's basketball team at the Varsity Court in Mattamy Athletic Centre in Toronto, Ontario.

Note: Records prior to the 1971–72 season are incomplete

Statistics overview
Season	Team	W	L	PF	PA	Pts.	Standing	Postseason
A.E. Toogood (Independent) (1949–1958)
1949–50	A.E. Toogood	–	–	–	–	–	–	–
1951–52	A.E. Toogood	–	–	–	–	–	–	–
1952–53	A.E. Toogood	–	–	–	–	–	–	–
1953–54	A.E. Toogood	–	–	–	–	–	–	–
1954–55	A.E. Toogood	–	–	–	–	–	–	–
1955–56	A.E. Toogood	–	–	–	–	–	–	–
1956–57	A.E. Toogood	–	–	–	–	–	–	
1957–58	A.E. Toogood	11	8	–	–	22	–	–
A.E. Toogood:		11–8 (.579)						
Bruce Forsythe (OIAA) (1958–1960)
1958–59	Bruce Forsythe	–	–	–	–	–	–	–
1959–60	Bruce Forsythe	–	–	–	–	–	–	–
Bruce Forsythe:		–						
Ed Trosyck (OIAA) (1960–1961)
1960–61	Ed Trosyck	1	7	–	–	2	–	–
Ed Trosyck:		1–7 (.125)						
Bruce Forsythe (OIAA) (1961–1962)
1960–61	Bruce Forsythe; Al Bowman	3	9	–	–	6	–	–
Bruce Forsythe:		3–9 (.250)						
Al Fleming (OIAA) (1962–1964)
1962–63	Al Fleming; Ron Potter	1	7	–	–	2	–	–
1963–64	Al Fleming	1	7	–	–	2	–	–
Al Fleming:		2–14 (.125)						
Angelo DiThomas (OIAA) (1964–1970)
1964–65	Angelo DiThomas	–	–	–	–	–	2nd (East)	–
1965–66	Angelo DiThomas	–	–	–	–	–	4th (East)	–
1966–67	Angelo DiThomas	–	–	–	–	–	–	–
1967–68	Angelo DiThomas	–	–	–	–	–	–	–
1968–69	Angelo DiThomas	–	–	–	–	–	–	–
1969–70	Angelo DiThomas	–	–	–	–	–	–	–
Angelo DiThomas:		–						
Ed DeArmon (OIAA) (1970–1971)
1970–71	Ed DeArmon	–	–	–	–	–	–	–
Ed DeArmon (OUAA) (1971–1979)
1971–72	Ed DeArmon	0	12	693	1052	0	7th (East)	–
1972–73	Ed DeArmon	1	11	697	957	2	7th (East)	–
1973–74	Ed DeArmon	4	10	870	1036	8	6th (East)	–
1974–75	Ed DeArmon	3	11	901	1098	6	7th (East)	–
1975–76	Ed DeArmon	2	12	964	1159	4	7th (East)	–
1976–77	Ed DeArmon	2	12	889	1295	4	7th (East)	–
1977–78	Ed DeArmon	0	12	674	930	0	7th (East)	–
1978–79	Ed DeArmon	0	12	685	1215	0	7th (East)	–
Ed DeArmon:		12–92 (.115)						
Phil Schlote (OUAA) (1979–1981)
1979–80	Phil Schlote	0	12	647	1090	0	7th (East)	–
1980–81	Phil Schlote	2	10	838	1021	4	7th (East)	–
Phil Schlote:		2–22 (.083)						
Terry Haggerty (OUAA) (1981–1997)
1981–82	Terry Haggerty	0	12	736	1082	0	7th (East)	–
1982–83	Terry Haggerty	2	12	945	1268	4	7th (East)	–
1983–84	Terry Haggerty	2	12	934	1237	4	7th (East)	–
1984–85	Terry Haggerty	7	12	1179	1178	14	5th (East)	–
1985–86	Terry Haggerty	5	9	992	1092	10	6th (East)	–
1986–87	Terry Haggerty	6	6	964	990	12	4th (East)	OUAA East Semifinalist
1987–88	Terry Haggerty	0	12	746	975	0	7th (East)	–
1988–89	Terry Haggerty	1	17	1236	1491	2	5th (Central)	–
1989–90	Terry Haggerty	4	14	1444	1818	8	5th (Central)	–
1990–91	Terry Haggerty	1	14	1032	1341	2	5th (Central)	–
1991–92	Terry Haggerty	2	13	903	1240	4	5th (Central)	–
1992–93	Terry Haggerty	4	8	931	1081	8	5th (East)	–
1993–94	Terry Haggerty	9	3	1023	923	18	2nd (East)	OUAA East Finalist
1994–95	Terry Haggerty	7	5	973	922	14	3rd (East)	OUAA East Finalist
1995–96	Terry Haggerty	6	6	991	973	12	4th (East)	OUAA East Semifinalist
1996–97	Terry Haggerty	11	9	1548	1528	22	4th (East)	OUAA East Semifinalist
Terry Haggerty (OUA) (1997–2003)
1997–98	Terry Haggerty	10	10	1409	1402	20	4th (East)	OUA East Semifinalist
1998–99	Terry Haggerty	10	10	1495	1544	20	4th (East)	OUA Finalist; CIAU Final 8
1999–2000	Terry Haggerty	17	3	1671	1474	34	1st (East)	OUA East Semifinalist
2000–01	Terry Haggerty	14	8	1597	1453	28	3rd (East)	OUA East Semifinalist
2001–02	Terry Haggerty	14	8	1577	1597	28	3rd (East)	OUA East Semifinalist
2002–03	Terry Haggerty	8	14	1465	1527	16	5th (East)	OUA East Semifinalist
Terry Haggerty:		140–217 (.392)						
Patrick Williams (OUA) (2003–2005)
2003–04	Patrick Williams	0	22	1283	1669	0	8th (East)	–
2004–05	Patrick Williams	1	21	1316	1657	2	8th (East)	–
Patrick Williams:		1–43 (.023)						
Glen Taylor (OUA) (2005–2009)
2005–06	Glen Taylor	3	19	1458	1653	6	7th (East)	–
2006–07	Glen Taylor	6	16	1466	1679	12	7th (East)	–
2007–08	Glen Taylor	7	15	1658	1772	14	6th (East)	OUA East Quarterfinalist
2008–09	Glen Taylor	12	10	1751	1749	24	4th (East)	OUA East Quarterfinalist
Glen Taylor:		28–60 (.318)						
Roy Rana (OUA) (2009–2019)
2009–10	Roy Rana	10	12	1587	1635	20	5th (East)	OUA East Quarterfinalist
2010–11	Roy Rana	11	11	1748	1752	22	4th (East)	OUA East Semifinalist
2011–12	Roy Rana	13	9	1718	1607	26	2nd (East)	OUA Finalist; CIS Final 8
2012–13	Roy Rana	15	5	1529	1339	30	3th (East)	OUA East Semifinalist
2013–14	Roy Rana	16	6	1710	1516	32	3th (East)	OUA East Semifinalist
2014–15	Roy Rana	17	2	1697	1249	34	3rd; 1st (East)	OUA Semifinalist; CIS Bronze Medalist
2015–16	Roy Rana; Patrick Tatham (interim)	17	2	1696	1402	34	1st	OUA Champion; CIS Bronze Medalist
2016–17	Roy Rana	17	2	1685	1284	34	3rd; 1st (East)	OUA Champion; U Sports Runner–up
2017–18	Roy Rana	17	6	1876	1687	34	3rd (East)	OUA Finalist; U Sports Runner–up
2018–19	Roy Rana	21	2	1993	1459	42	2nd (East)	OUA Finalist; U Sports Bronze
Roy Rana:		154–57 (.730)						
Borko Popic (interim) (OUA) (2019–2020)
2019–20	Borko Popic (interim)	16	6	1945	1585	32	2nd (Central)	OUA Quarterfinalist
Borko Popic (interim):		16–6 (.727)						
2020–21	Season canceled due to COVID-19 pandemic							
David DeAveiro (OUA) (2021–present)
2021–22	David DeAveiro	8	6	1184	1118	16	4th (East)	OUA Quarterfinalist
2022–23	David DeAveiro	14	8	1834	1674	28	3rd (Central)	OUA Quarterfinalist
2023–24	David DeAveiro	13	9	1790	1659	26	2nd (Central)	OUA Quarterfinalist
2024–25	David DeAveiro	15	7	1783	1514	30	2nd (Central)	OUA Semifinalist
2025–26	David DeAveiro	17	5	1823	1493	34	2nd (Central)	OUA Champion; U Sports Final 8
David DeAveiro:		67–35 (.657)						
Total:		437–570 (.434)						
National champion Postseason invitational champion Conference regular season champion Conference regular season and conference tournament champion Division regular season champion Division regular season and conference tournament champion Conference tournament champion

== Postseason results ==
The TMU Bold made it to the postseason in 28 seasons. In all of those seasons, the Bold played in the Wilson Cup playoffs, and in 7 of those seasons, the team made it to the national Final 8 playoffs.

=== OUA Wilson Cup ===
The TMU Bold have appeared in the OUA's Wilson Cup playoffs 28 times, winning 2 titles.

Year	Seed	Round	Opponent	Result
1987		Quarterfinals; Consolation Round	Laurentian; York	L 78–83; W 91–78
1994		Quarterfinals; Semifinals	Toronto; Laurentian	W 72–52; L 73–85
1995		Quarterfinals; Semifinals	Laurentian; Toronto	W 101–91; L 73–79
1996		Quarterfinals	Toronto	L 82–102
1997		Quarterfinals	Laurentian	L 75–81
1998		Quarterfinals	Laurentian	L 64–88
1999		Quarterfinals; Semifinals; Championship	Laurentian; Carleton; Western	W 74–66; W 50–44; L 70–87
2000		Quarterfinals	Queen's	L 69–73
2001		First Round	York	L 59–69
2002		First Round; Quarterfinals	Ottawa; York	W 71–67; L 53–59
2003		First Round; Quarterfinals	Laurentian; Carleton	W 85–67; L 57–70
2008		First Round	Ottawa	L 49–76
2009		First Round	York	L 69–71
2010		First Round	Queen's	L 76–79^{OT}
2011		First Round; Quarterfinals	York; Carleton	W 80–70; L 73–97
2012		Quarterfinals; Semifinals; Championship	Ottawa; Lakehead; Carleton	W 74–71; W 86–70; L 39–82
2013		First Round; Quarterfinals	York; Ottawa	W 83–77; L 70–74
2014		First Round; Quarterfinals	Queen's; Ottawa	W 86–76; L 78–79
2015		Quarterfinals; Semifinals; Bronze Medal	Laurier; Carleton; Ottawa	W 105–59; L 80–84; L 66–79
2016		Quarterfinals; Semifinals; Championship	Lakehead; Windsor; Carleton	W 93–71; W 96–77; W 73–68
2017		Quarterfinals; Semifinals; Championship	Ottawa; Nipissing; Carleton	W 87–62; W 76–75; W 86–79
2018		First Round; Quarterfinals; Semifinals; Championship	Queen's; Ottawa; Brock; Carleton	W 103–79; W 77–69; W 69–63; L 58–84
2019		Quarterfinals; Semifinals; Championship	Ottawa; Laurier; Carleton	W 84–61; W 99–84; L 61–81
2020		First Round; Quarterfinals	Guelph; Ottawa	W 109–63; L 54–75
2022		First Round; Quarterfinals	Laurentian; Carleton	W 92–61; L 68–87
2023		Quarterfinals; Semifinals	McMaster; Ottawa	W 104–92; L 72–73
2024		Quarterfinals	McMaster	L 67–74
2025		First Round; Quarterfinals; Semifinals	Guelph; Western; Ottawa	W 89–63; W 101–78; L 56–89
2026		Quarterfinals; Semifinals; Championship	Guelph; Brock; Carleton	W 82–75; W 77–64; W 66–56

=== U Sports Final 8 ===
The TMU Bold have appeared in the U Sports men's basketball championship 7 times.

Year	Seed	Round	Opponent	Result
1999		Quarterfinals; Consolation Semifinals	Alberta; Bishop's	L 83–100; L 77–81
2012	#7	Quarterfinals; Consolation Semifinals; Consolation Finals	#2 Alberta #3 Concordia #8 Acadia	L 52–81; W 84–80; L 83–90
2015	#7	Quarterfinals; Semifinals; Bronze Medal	#2 Windsor #3 Ottawa #4 Victoria	W 82–68; L 75–84; W 82–68
2016	#1	Quarterfinals; Semifinals; Bronze Medal	#8 British Columbia #4 Calgary #6 Dalhousie	W 109–101^{OT} L 87–98; W 85–78
2017	#1	Quarterfinals; Semifinals; Championship	#8 Saint Mary's #5 Dalhousie #2 Carleton	W 79–70; W 59–58; L 69–78
2018	#5	Quarterfinals; Semifinals; Championship	#4 Alberta #1 Carleton #2 Calgary	W 88–62; W 84–76; L 77–79
2019	#3	Quarterfinals; Semifinals; Bronze Medal	#6 Concordia #2 Calgary #5 Dalhousie	W 87–47; L 65–67; W 84–66
2026	#2	Quarterfinals; Semifinals; Bronze Medal	#7 British Columbia #6 Carleton #1 Victoria	W 97–91; L 52–58; L 81–85

== Notable players ==
Player	Position	Team(s)	League(s)	Years at TMU	Titles
Aaron Best	Shooting guard	BC Juventus (2016–17); Raptors 905 (2017–18; 2021–22); Riesen Ludwigsburg (2018–19); PAOK BC (2019–20); Boulazac Basket Dordogne (2020–21); Hamilton Honey Badgers (2022); London Lions (2022–23); Trefl Sopot (2023–25); BC Andorra (2025–present)	LKL; NBA G League; BBL; GBL; LNB Pro B; CEBL; SLB; PLK; Liga ACB	2011–2016	PLK champion (2024)
Ammanuel Diressa	Shooting guard	KK FMP (2018–19); Hamilton Honey Badgers (2020); Scarborough Shooting Stars (2024–present)	ABA League; CEBL	2015–2018	
Jean-Victor Mukama	Small forward/power forward	Patriots BBC (2019–20; 2023); Hamilton Honey Badgers (2020); Aris Leeuwarden (2020–21); Club Melilla Baloncesto (2021); Scarborough Shooting Stars (2022); REG BBC (2023–24); APR BBC (2024–present)	RBL; CEBL; DBL; LEB Oro	2013–2019	
Tanor Ngom	Center	CD Póvoa (2022–23); AB Castelló (2023–present)	LPB; LEB Oro	2017–2020	
Adika Peter-McNeilly	Guard	Riesen Ludwigsburg (2017–18); Mitteldeutscher BC (2018–19); Edmonton Stingers (2020; 2021–2023; 2024–present); Lille Métropole BC (2020–2021); CSM Constanța (2021); Club Ourense Baloncesto (2023–2024)	BBL; LNB Pro B; CEBL; Liga Națională; LEB Oro	2013–2017	2x CEBL champion (2020, 2021)
