= 2024 U Sports Men's Basketball Championship =

Canadian university basketball championship

- Season: 2023-24
- Teams: Eight
- Finals site: Amphithéâtre Desjardins; Quebec City, Quebec
- Champions: Laval Rouge et Or (1st title)
- Runner-up: Queen's Gaels
- Winning coach: Nathan Grant (1st title)
- Tournament MVP (Jack Donahue Trophy): Ismael Diouf (Laval)
- Attendance: 3,000
- Television: CBC, TVA

The 2024 U Sports Men's Final 8 Basketball Tournament was held March 8–10, 2024, in Quebec City, Quebec, to determine a national champion for the 2023–24 U Sports men's basketball season. With both naming and presenting partners, the tournament was officially called the 2024 GreenShield U SPORTS Men's Final 8, presented by Michelob Ultra. Host and lowest seed Université Laval Rouge et Or won the championship title, the first in the program's history, beating the Queen's Gaels 77-71.

== Host ==
The tournament was hosted by Université Laval at the school's Amphithéâtre Desjardins, which has a seating capacity of 3,000 for basketball. This was the first time the school hosted the men's championship, while also being the first time the province of Quebec hosted.

== Participating teams ==
The seeding for teams was announced on March 3, 2024, with the Ottawa Gee-Gees being awarded the at-large berth. For the first time since 2002, the Carleton Ravens did not play in the national tournament, and so did not defend their 2023 title. Carleton has been a dominant force in the annual contest, having won 17 of the previous 20 national titles.

Seed	Team	Qualified	Record	Last	Total
1	Victoria Vikes	Canada West Champion	17–3	1997	8
2	Queen's Gaels	OUA Champion	19–3	None	0
3	UQAM Citadins	RSEQ Champion	11–5	None	0
4	Dalhousie Tigers	AUS Champion	11–9	None	0
5	Brock Badgers	OUA Finalist	11–11	2008	2
6	Ottawa Gee-Gees	OUA Quarterfinalist (At-large berth)	19–3	None	0
7	Winnipeg Wesmen	Canada West Finalist	15–5	None	0
8	Laval Rouge et Or	RSEQ Semifinalist (Host)	6–10	None	0

== Championship bracket ==
The tournament began on Eastern Standard Time. Clocks changed to Eastern Daylight Time ahead of games on March 10.

First Round: March 8
1	Victoria Vikes	69
8	Laval Rouge et Or	75
4	Dalhousie Tigers	68
5	Brock Badgers	53
2	Queen's Gaels	77
7	Winnipeg Wesmen	76
3	UQAM Citadins	71
6	Ottawa Gee-Gees	78

Semi-Finals: March 9
4	Dalhousie Tigers	74
8	Laval Rouge et Or	85
2	Queen's Gaels	84
6	Ottawa Gee-Gees	77

Gold Medal Game: March 10
2	Queen's Gaels	71
8	Laval Rouge et Or	77
Bronze Medal Game: March 10
4	Dalhousie Tigers	83
6	Ottawa Gee-Gees	91

== Consolation bracket ==
Games on March 9 took place on Eastern Standard Time. Clocks changed to Eastern Daylight Time ahead of the game on March 10.

Semi-Finals: March 9
3	UQAM Citadins	88
7	Winnipeg Wesmen	80
1	Victoria Vikes	71
5	Brock Badgers	61

Fifth Place Game: March 10
1	Victoria Vikes	70
3	UQAM Citadins	80
