= Ammanuel Diressa =

Canadian professional basketball player

No. 31 – Scarborough Shooting Stars
- Position: Shooting guard
- League: CEBL

Personal information
- Born: May 5, 1993 (age 33) Toronto, Ontario, Canada
- Listed height: 1.93 m (6 ft 4 in)
- Listed weight: 86 kg (190 lb)

Career information
- High school: Eastern Commerce (Toronto, Ontario)
- College: Tennessee Tech (2012–2014); Ryerson (2015–2018)
- NBA draft: 2018: undrafted
- Playing career: 2018–present

Career history
- 2018–2019: FMP
- 2020: Hamilton Honey Badgers
- 2024–present: Scarborough Shooting Stars

Career highlights
- U Sports All-Canadian First-team (2018); U Sports Final Eight First Team (2017, 2018); OUA Finals MVP (2017); 2× All-OUA First-team (2017, 2018); All-OUA Second-team (2016)
Medals
Men's basketball
Representing Canada
Commonwealth Games
Silver medal – second place	2018 Gold Coast	Team

Ammanuel Gorfu Diressa (born May 5, 1993), is a Canadian professional basketball player for the Scarborough Shooting Stars of the Canadian Elite Basketball League (CEBL). He represents Canada in international competition. He played college basketball for the Tennessee Tech Golden Eagles and Ryerson Rams at what is now Toronto Metropolitan University.

== Early life ==
Diressa was born in Toronto, Ontario, to an Ethiopian single parent mother, Almaz Diressa, and a Greek father who was not involved. He attended Eastern Commerce Collegiate Institute in Toronto. He averaged 17.3 points, 8.7 rebounds, and 4.3 assists per game in his senior year and lead his high school to win the South Region championship and the Toronto championship with a 37-7 record.

== College career ==
=== Tennessee Tech ===
Diressa played his freshman and sophomore seasons for the Tennessee Tech Golden Eagles of the Ohio Valley Conference (NCAA Division I) from 2012 to 2014. In 2012–13 season, he averaged 1.8 points per game. As a sophomore in the 2013–14 season, he averaged 1.9 points per game.

=== Ryerson ===
In 2015, Diressa joined Ryerson Rams of the Ontario University Athletics (U Sports). He appeared in 18 season games in the Rams' 2015–16 season. He averaged 14.9 points, 5.3 rebounds and 2.9 assists per game during the season. On December 19, 2016 he scored season-high 23 points against the Charleston. On February 4, 2017, he pulled down career-high 16 rebounds against the Texas A&M. He scored a career-high 30 points in a 97-68 win at the Nipissing on January 30, 2016. Diressa had 20 or more points in six conference games and 10 or more in six games. He averaged 16.1 points per game in five post–season games.

Diressa appeared in 18 games, including 17 starts in the 2016–17 season. He averaged 19.0 points, 4.8 rebounds, and 3.1 assists per game during the regular season. He recorded at least 11 points in every single played game and at least 20 points on nine occasions. He averaged 16.7 points per game in three contests at the 2017 U Sports Men's Basketball Championship.

Diressa appeared in 18 games, including 17 starts in the 2017–18 season. He averaged 21.8 points, 5.3 rebounds, and 3.5 assists per game during the regular season. He put up 20 or more points in 13 regular-season games. He averaged 23.1 points per game in seven games at the 2018 U Sports Men's Basketball Championship. On January 15, 2018, he scored a career-high 50 points and grabbed a career-high 15 rebounds against the York. Diressa finished his Ryerson career with both the OUA medals (gold in 2016, 2017; and silver in 2018) and the U Sports medals (silver in 2017, 2018, bronze in 2016) in each of his three seasons with the university. He became the 10th player in Rams history to break 1,000 career points, finishing with 1,002, and the only player to do so in three seasons.

== Professional career ==
=== Serbia ===
On August 1, 2018, Diressa signed a three-year contract with Serbian team FMP. FMP parted ways with him in February 2019.

=== Hamilton Honey Badgers ===
In 2020, Diressa signed with the Hamilton Honey Badgers of the Canadian Elite Basketball League.

=== Scarborough Shooting Stars ===
In 2024, Diressa signed with the Scarborough Shooting Stars of the Canadian Elite Basketball League.

== National team career ==
Diressa was a member of the Canada national basketball team that won the silver medal at the 2018 Commonwealth Games. Over six tournament games, he averaged 14.0 points, 1.7 rebounds and 2.2 assists per game. Also, he was a team member at the 2017 FIBA AmeriCup. Over three tournament games, he averaged 4.3 points and 0.3 assists per game.
