= U Sports men's basketball championship =

Canadian collegiate men's basketball championship award

- Current season, competition or edition: 2026 U Sports Men's Basketball Championship
- Sport: Basketball
- Founded: 1963; 63 years ago
- First season: 1963
- Organizing body: U Sports
- No. of teams: 8
- Country: Canada
- Most recent champion: Carleton Ravens (18)
- Most titles: Carleton Ravens (18)
- Broadcasters: CBC, TVA
- Website: usports.ca/en/sports/basketball/m

The U Sports Men's Basketball Championship, branded as the Men's Basketball Final 8, is a Canadian university basketball tournament conducted by U Sports, and determines the men's national champion. The tournament involves the champions from each of Canada's four regional sports conferences. The W. P. McGee trophy is awarded to the winners.

Twenty different schools have won the tournament. Carleton University have the most tournament wins with 18 championships. The University of Victoria has nine championships, Saint Mary's University, Brandon University, and the University of Windsor have four championships, the University of Alberta, St. Francis Xavier University, and Acadia University have three championships, Brock University, and the University of British Columbia have two championships. Eleven programs are tied with one national championship.

== History ==
Assumption University has the distinction of originating the national championship trophy. In 1963, the University of Windsor Alumni Association donated the award featuring a silver basketball, and named in memory of W.P. McGee for his outstanding contribution as both teacher and coach during the 1920s and 1930s. Assumption won the first McGee trophy, the only time it took the national title under the Assumption name. The University of Windsor would win it four times in that same decade (1960s). For more than 60 years, the McGee trophy has been awarded annually to the U Sports men's basketball champion.

The tournament first consisted of only conference champions (four or five teams) and held that format from 1963 until 1971. In 1972 and 1973, only four teams qualified, regardless of conferences. In 1974, the championship expanded to include eight teams, similar to the format seen today. That was again changed in 1983 where regional championships took place with up to 16 teams participating in up to five different cities with the national championship featuring four teams in the main host city.

In 1984, Dalhousie University hosted the championship in what would be the first of 24 straight years that Halifax, Nova Scotia would host. The format reverted to an eight team national championship in 1987, which would be the consistent format until 2004 when the tournament expanded to ten teams. The Final 10 format would last only three years, until it was again reverted to a Final 8 tournament in 2007. In 2008, the finals moved to Scotiabank Place in Ottawa for three years. After two years back in Halifax, the next two tournaments were held in the now renamed Canadian Tire Centre (formerly Scotiabank Place). The 2015 championship was hosted by Ryerson University, while the 2016 tournament was hosted by the University of British Columbia.

The 2021 championship tournament was cancelled due to the COVID-19 pandemic.

== Format ==
The championship consists of an eight-team single-elimination tournament. Four teams automatically qualify for the tournament as one of the winners of the four conferences, two qualify as the runners-up of both the OUA and Canada West conference, one qualifies as the host, and one is given an at-large berth.

The tournament is played over four days. The quarterfinals are played on the Thursday, the consolation semi-finals on Friday, the consolation final and championship semi-finals on Saturday, and the bronze and gold medal games on Sunday. This format has been in use since 2015.

== Results ==
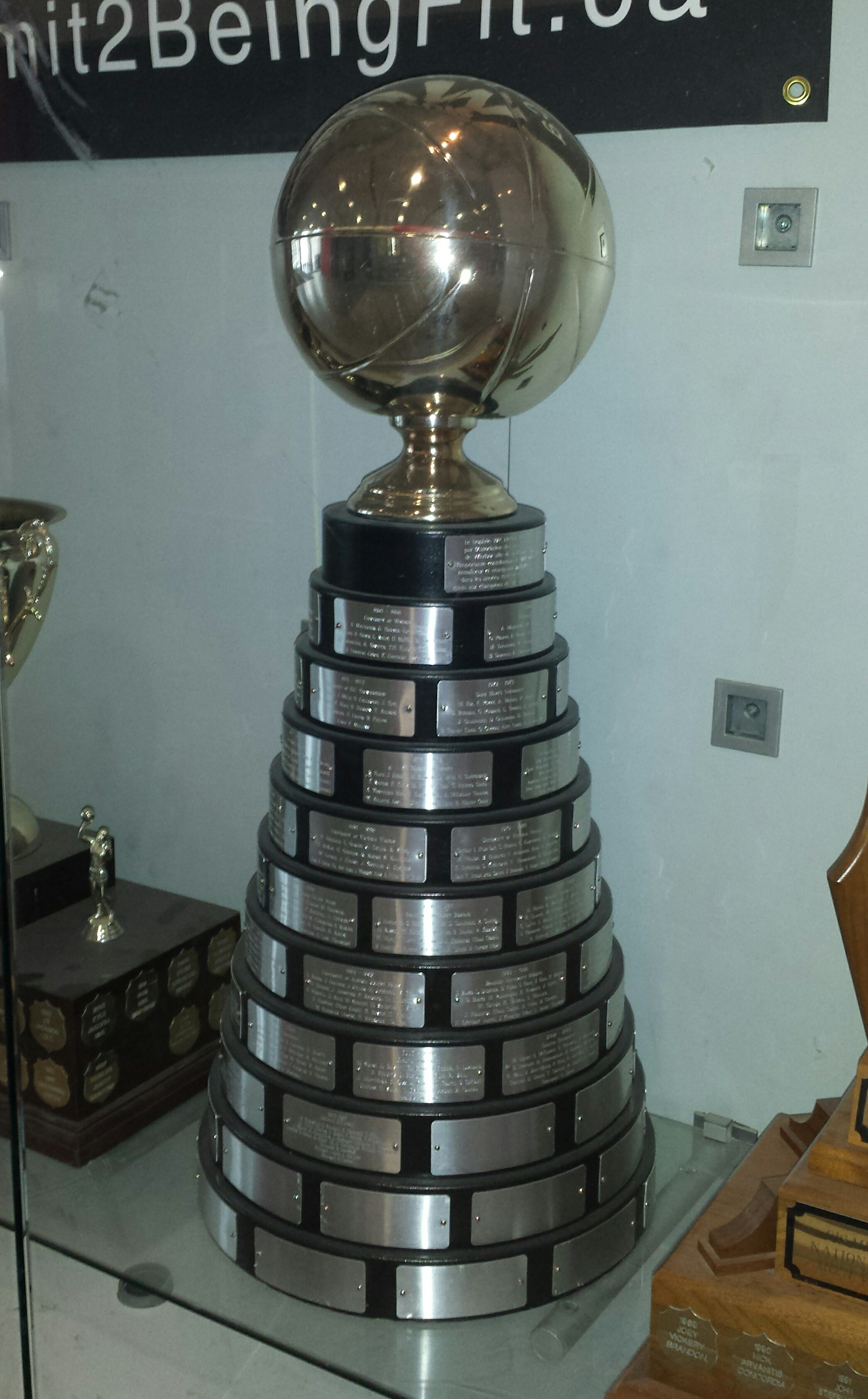
W. P. McGee trophy, awarded to the champion team

Year	Winner	Runner-up	Score	Venue
1963	Assumption College	Acadia Axemen	55–50	University of Windsor
1964	Windsor Lancers	UBC Thunderbirds	94–70	University of Windsor
1965	Acadia Axemen	Windsor Lancers	91–87 (OT)	Saint Mary's University
1966	Windsor Lancers (2)	Calgary Dinos	95–83	University of Calgary
1967	Windsor Lancers (3)	UBC Thunderbirds (2)	87–82	University of Calgary
1968	Waterloo Lutheran Golden Hawks	Saint Mary's Huskies	66–61	St. Francis Xavier University
1969	Windsor Lancers (4)	Waterloo Lutheran Golden Hawks	76–63	University of Waterloo
1970	UBC Thunderbirds	McMaster Marauders	96–75	McMaster University
1971	Acadia Axemen (2)	Manitoba Bisons	72–48	Acadia University
1972	UBC Thunderbirds (2)	Acadia Axemen (2)	87–80	University of British Columbia
1973	Saint Mary's Huskies	Lakehead Thunderwolves	79–67	University of Waterloo
1974	Guelph Gryphons	Saint Mary's Huskies (2)	74–72	University of Waterloo
1975	Waterloo Warriors	Manitoba Bisons (2)	80–79	University of Waterloo
1976	Manitoba Bisons	Saint Mary's Huskies (3)	82–69	Saint Mary's University
1977	Acadia Axemen (3)	Lakehead Thunderwolves (2)	72–63	Saint Mary's University
1978	Saint Mary's Huskies (2)	Acadia Axemen (3)	99–91	Saint Mary's University
1979	Saint Mary's Huskies (3)	Victoria Vikes	90–83	University of Calgary
1980	Victoria Vikes	Brandon Bobcats	73–65	University of Calgary
1981	Victoria Vikes (2)	Acadia Axemen (4)	81–70	University of Waterloo
1982	Victoria Vikes (3)	Saint Mary's Huskies (4)	74–60	University of Victoria
1983	Victoria Vikes (4)	Waterloo Warriors	63–52	University of Waterloo
1984	Victoria Vikes (5)	Brandon Bobcats (2)	70–62	Dalhousie University
1985	Victoria Vikes (6)	Waterloo Warriors (2)	93–79	Dalhousie University
1986	Victoria Vikes (7)	Waterloo Warriors (3)	70–61	Dalhousie University
1987	Brandon Bobcats	UBC Thunderbirds (3)	74–66	Dalhousie University
1988	Brandon Bobcats (2)	Acadia Axemen (5)	81–68	Halifax Metro Centre
1989	Brandon Bobcats (3)	Victoria Vikes (2)	74–73	Halifax Metro Centre
1990	Concordia Stingers	Guelph Gryphons	80–62	Halifax Metro Centre
1991	Western Ontario Mustangs	Guelph Gryphons (2)	78–69	Halifax Metro Centre
1992	Brock Badgers	Saint Mary's Huskies (5)	77–71	Halifax Metro Centre
1993	St. Francis Xavier X-Men	McMaster Marauders (2)	72–64	Halifax Metro Centre
1994	Alberta Golden Bears	McMaster Marauders (3)	73–66	Halifax Metro Centre
1995	Alberta Golden Bears (2)	Concordia Stingers	84–66	Halifax Metro Centre
1996	Brandon Bobcats (4)	Alberta Golden Bears	79–72	Halifax Metro Centre
1997	Victoria Vikes (8)	McMaster Marauders (4)	84–73	Halifax Metro Centre
1998	Bishop's Gaiters	McMaster Marauders (5)	74–71	Halifax Metro Centre
1999	Saint Mary's Huskies (4)	Alberta Golden Bears (2)	73–69 (OT)	Halifax Metro Centre
2000	St. Francis Xavier X-Men (2)	Brandon Bobcats (3)	61–60	Halifax Metro Centre
2001	St. Francis Xavier X-Men (3)	Brandon Bobcats (4)	83–76 (OT)	Halifax Metro Centre
2002	Alberta Golden Bears (3)	Western Ontario Mustangs	76–71	Halifax Metro Centre
2003	Carleton Ravens	Guelph Gryphons (3)	57–54	Halifax Metro Centre
2004	Carleton Ravens (2)	St. Francis Xavier X-Men	63–59	Halifax Metro Centre
2005	Carleton Ravens (3)	Concordia Stingers	68–48	Halifax Metro Centre
2006	Carleton Ravens (4)	Victoria Vikes (3)	73–67	Halifax Metro Centre
2007	Carleton Ravens (5)	Brandon Bobcats (5)	52–49	Halifax Metro Centre
2008	Brock Badgers (2)	Acadia Axemen (6)	64–61	Scotiabank Place
2009	Carleton Ravens (6)	UBC Thunderbirds (4)	87–77	Scotiabank Place
2010	Saskatchewan Huskies	UBC Thunderbirds (5)	91–81	Scotiabank Place
2011	Carleton Ravens (7)	Trinity Western Spartans	82–59	Halifax Metro Centre
2012	Carleton Ravens (8)	Alberta Golden Bears (3)	86–67	Halifax Metro Centre
2013	Carleton Ravens (9)	Lakehead Thunderwolves (3)	92–42	Scotiabank Place
2014	Carleton Ravens (10)	Ottawa Gee-Gees	79–67	Canadian Tire Centre
2015	Carleton Ravens (11)	Ottawa Gee-Gees (2)	93–46	Ryerson University
2016	Carleton Ravens (12)	Calgary Dinos (2)	101–79	University of British Columbia
2017	Carleton Ravens (13)	Ryerson Rams	78–69	Scotiabank Centre
2018	Calgary Dinos	Ryerson Rams (2)	79–77	Scotiabank Centre
2019	Carleton Ravens (14)	Calgary Dinos (3)	84–49	Scotiabank Centre
2020	Carleton Ravens (15)	Dalhousie Tigers	74–65	TD Place Arena
2021	Cancelled due to the COVID-19 pandemic			Scotiabank Centre
2022	Carleton Ravens (16)	Saskatchewan Huskies	85–72	Saville Community Sports Centre
2023	Carleton Ravens (17)	St. Francis Xavier X-Men (2)	109–104 (2OT)	Scotiabank Centre
2024	Laval Rouge et Or	Queen's Gaels	77–71	Amphithéâtre Desjardins
2025	Victoria Vikes (9)	Calgary Dinos (4)	82–53	Thunderbird Sports Centre
2026	Carleton Ravens (18)	Bishop's Gaiters	78–75	Jack Simpson Gymnasium
2027				Scotiabank Centre

== Title by school ==
Appearances	Team	Conference	Wins	Losses	Win %	MRC	MRA
18	Carleton Ravens	OUA	18	0	1.000	2026	2026
12	Victoria Vikes	Canada West	9	3	.750	2025	2025
9	Saint Mary's Huskies	AUS	4	5	.444	1999	1999
9	Brandon Bobcats	Canada West	4	5	.444	1996	2007
8	Acadia Axemen	AUS	3	5	.375	1977	1988
7	UBC Thunderbirds	Canada West	2	5	.285	1972	2010
6	Alberta Golden Bears	Canada West	3	3	.500	2002	2012
5	Windsor Lancers	OUA	4	1	.800	1969	1969
5	McMaster Marauders	OUA	0	5	.000	None	1998
5	St. Francis Xavier X-Men	AUS	3	2	.600	2001	2023
5	Calgary Dinos	Canada West	1	4	.200	2018	2025
4	Waterloo Warriors	OUA	1	3	.250	1975	1986
4	Guelph Gryphons	OUA	1	3	.250	1974	2003
3	Manitoba Bisons	Canada West	1	2	.333	1976	1976
3	Lakehead Thunderwolves	OUA	0	3	.000	None	2013
2	Waterloo Lutheran Golden Hawks	OUA	1	1	.500	1968	1969
2	Western Ontario Mustangs	OUA	1	1	.500	1991	2002
2	Concordia Stingers	RSEQ	1	1	.500	1990	2005
2	Brock Badgers	OUA	2	0	1.000	2008	2008
2	Ottawa Gee-Gees	OUA	0	2	.000	None	2015
2	Ryerson Rams/TMU Bold	OUA	0	2	.000	None	2018
2	Saskatchewan Huskies	Canada West	1	1	.500	2010	2022
2	Bishop's Gaiters	RSEQ	1	1	.500	1998	2026
1	Assumption College	OUA	1	0	1.000	1963	1963
1	Laval Rouge et Or	RSEQ	1	0	1.000	2024	2024
1	Trinity Western Spartans	Canada West	0	1	.000	None	2011
1	Dalhousie Tigers	AUS	0	1	.000	None	2020
1	Queen's Gaels	OUA	0	1	.000	None	2024

== See also ==
- NCAA Division I men's basketball tournament
- College basketball
