= 2019 U Sports Men's Basketball Championship =

Canadian university basketball championship

- Season: 2018-19
- Teams: Eight
- Finals site: Scotiabank Centre; Halifax, Nova Scotia
- Champions: Carleton Ravens (14th title)
- Runner-up: Calgary Dinos
- Winning coach: Taffe Charles
- Jack Donohue Trophy (tournament MVP): Eddie Ekiyor (Carleton Ravens)

The 2019 U Sports Men's Final 8 Basketball Tournament was the 57th edition of the U Sports men's basketball championship, a postseason tournament to determine the national champion of the 2018–19 U Sports men's basketball season. The tournament was held March 7–10, 2019, at the Scotiabank Centre in Halifax, Nova Scotia. The Carleton Ravens won the tournament, beating defending national champions, the Calgary Dinos, 83-49. The win extended Carleton's record number of men's basketball titles to 14.

== Host ==
The tournament was hosted by Dalhousie University, which has hosted the championship five other times, most recently in 2017. Sports & Entertainment Atlantic (S|E|A) was a production partner for the event, its third year coordinating the championship game. The tournament was held at the Scotiabank Centre for the third consecutive year and it was the 32nd time that the tournament was played in Halifax.

== Participating teams ==
Seed	Team	Qualified
1	Carleton Ravens	OUA Champion
2	Calgary Dinos	Canada West Champion
3	Ryerson Rams	OUA Finalist
4	UBC Thunderbirds	Canada West Finalist
5	Dalhousie Tigers	AUS Champion (Host)
6	Concordia Stingers	RSEQ Champion
7	Saint Mary's Huskies	AUS Finalist
8	Alberta Golden Bears	Canada West Semifinalist (At-large berth)

== Championship Bracket ==
First Round: March 8
1	Carleton Ravens	100
8	Alberta Golden Bears	60
4	UBC Thunderbirds	65
5	Dalhousie Tigers	74
2	Calgary Dinos	94
7	Saint Mary's Huskies	78
3	Ryerson Rams	87
6	Concordia Stingers	47

Semi-Finals: March 9
1	Carleton Ravens	76
5	Dalhousie Tigers	65
2	Calgary Dinos	67
3	Ryerson Rams	65

Final: March 10
1	Carleton Ravens	83
2	Calgary Dinos	49
Bronze Medal Game: March 10
3	Ryerson Rams	84
5	Dalhousie Tigers	66

== Consolation Bracket ==
Semi-Finals: March 9
4	UBC Thunderbirds	72
8	Alberta Golden Bears	65
6	Concordia Stingers	67
7	Saint Mary's Huskies	84

Fifth Place Game: March 10
4	UBC Thunderbirds	95
7	Saint Mary's Huskies	86
