= 2027 U Sports Men's Basketball Championship =

Canadian university basketball championship

- Season: 2026-27
- Teams: Eight
- Finals site: Scotiabank Centre; Halifax, Nova Scotia

The 2027 U Sports Men's Final 8 Basketball Tournament is scheduled to be held March 11 to March 14, 2027, in Halifax, Nova Scotia, to determine a national champion for the 2026–27 U Sports men's basketball season.

== Host ==
The tournament is scheduled to be hosted by Dalhousie University at Scotiabank Centre. This will be the 32nd time that Halifax has hosted the tournament with the most recent in 2023. It will take place at the same time as the 2027 U Sports Women's Basketball Championship which is also being held at Scotiabank Centre.

== Scheduled teams ==
- Canada West Representative
- OUA Representative
- RSEQ Representative
- AUS Representative
- Host (Dalhousie Tigers)
- Three additional berths
