= 2017 U Sports Women's Volleyball Championship =

Canadian university volleyball championship

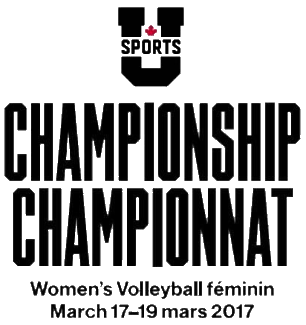
- Season: 2016–17
- Teams: Eight
- Finals site: Mattamy Athletic Centre; Toronto, Ontario
- Champions: UBC Thunderbirds (11th title)
- Runner-up: Alberta Pandas
- Winning coach: Doug Reimer (8th title)
- Championship MVP: Danielle Brisebois (UBC Thunderbirds)

The 2017 U Sports Women's Volleyball Championship was held from March 17 to March 19, 2017, in Toronto, Ontario, to determine a national champion for the 2016–17 U Sports women's volleyball season. The tournament was played at the Mattamy Athletic Centre and hosted by Ryerson University (now Toronto Metropolitan University). It was the first time that Ryerson had hosted the tournament.

The third-seeded UBC Thunderbirds defeated the top-seeded Alberta Pandas in the gold medal match 3–1 to claim their league-leading 11th women's volleyball national championship.

== Participating teams ==
Seed	Team	Qualified	Record	Last	Total
1	Alberta Pandas	Canada West Champion	22–2	2007	7
2	McMaster Marauders	OUA Champion	16–3	None	0
3	UBC Thunderbirds	Canada West Finalist	20–4	2013	10
4	Montreal Carabins	RSEQ Champion	15–5	None	0
5	Dalhousie Tigers	AUS Champion	19–1	1982	1
6	Western Mustangs	OUA Finalist	15–4	1976	3
7	Trinity Western Spartans	Canada West Bronze	21–3	2015	1
8	Ryerson Rams	OUA Semifinalist (Host)	15–4	None	0

== Championship bracket ==
First Round: March 17
1	Alberta Pandas	3
8	Ryerson Rams	0
4	Montreal Carabins	3
5	Dalhousie Tigers	0
2	McMaster Marauders	0
7	Trinity Western Spartans	3
3	UBC Thunderbirds	3
6	Western Mustangs	1

Semi-Finals: March 18
1	Alberta Pandas	3
4	Montreal Carabins	0
7	Trinity Western Spartans	0
3	UBC Thunderbirds	3

Gold Medal Game: March 19
1	Alberta Pandas	1
3	UBC Thunderbirds	3
Bronze Medal Game: March 19
4	Montreal Carabins	2
7	Trinity Western Spartans	3

== Consolation bracket ==
Semi-Finals: March 18
2	McMaster Marauders	1
6	Western Mustangs	3
5	Dalhousie Tigers	3
8	Ryerson Rams	1

Fifth Place Game: March 19
6	Western Mustangs	0
5	Dalhousie Tigers	3

== Awards ==
=== Championship awards ===
- CIS Championship MVP – Danielle Brisebois, UBC
- R.W. Pugh Fair Play Award – Abby Czenze, Dalhousie

=== All-Star Team ===
- Danielle Brisebois, UBC
- Maggie Li, UBC
- Alessandra Gentile, UBC
- Meg Casault, Alberta
- Kacey Otto, Alberta
- Sophie Carpentier, Trinity Western
- Marie-Alex Bélanger, Montreal
