= Tanor Ngom =

Senegalese basketball player

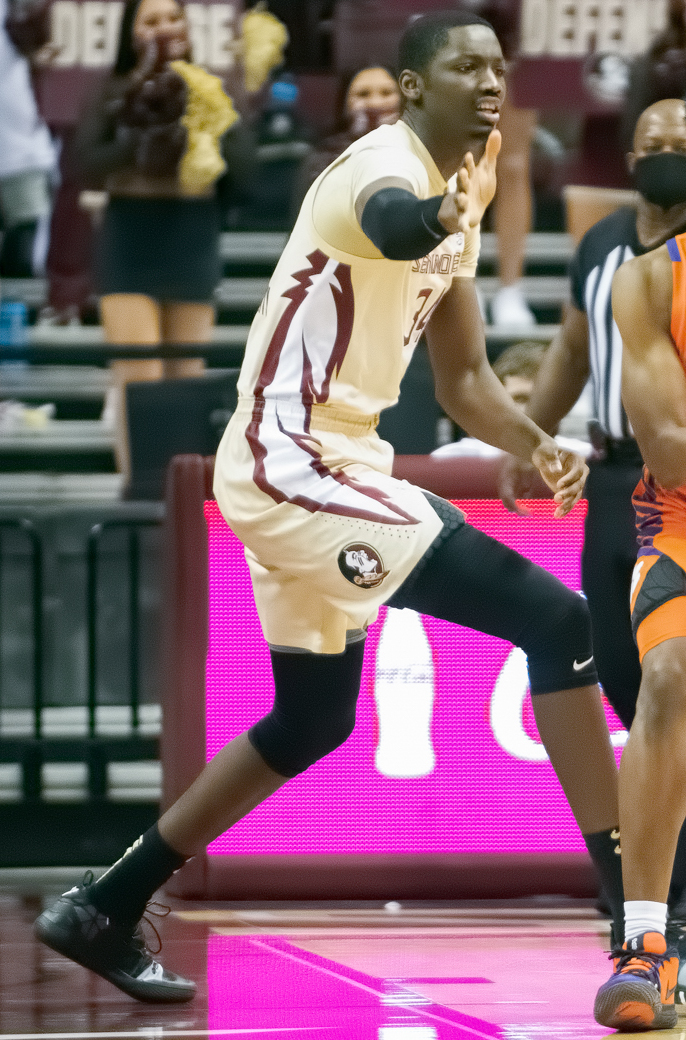

No. 0 – Gipuzkoa Basket
- Position: Center
- League: Primera FEB

Personal information
- Born: 19 January 1998 (age 28) Dakar, Senegal
- Listed height: 7 ft 2 in (2.18 m)
- Listed weight: 236 lb (107 kg)

Career information
- College: Ryerson (2017–2020); Florida State (2020–2022)

Career history
- 2022–2023: CD Póvoa
- 2023–2025: AB Castelló
- 2025–present: Gipuzkoa Basket

Career highlights
- Second-team OUA All-Star (2020); OUA All-Rookie Team (2018)

Elhadj Abdoulaye Tanor Ngom (born 19 January 1998) is a Senegalese professional basketball player for Gipuzkoa Basket of the Spanish Primera FEB. He played collegiately for the Ryerson Rams and the Florida State Seminoles.

== Early life and youth career ==
A native of Dakar, Senegal, Ngom stood about 1.91 m (6 ft 3 in) when he was 12 years old. He began taking interest in basketball at age 14, even though his father initially wanted him to focus on his education instead. Due to the lack of facilities, he ran on the beach and did push-ups to train, impressing his father. At age 15, Ngom moved away from his family to play for the youth program of Unicaja Málaga in Spain. While in Spain, he was discovered by his fellow countryman Boniface N'Dong who put Ngom in contact with Holger Geschwindner, the mentor of Dirk Nowitzki. Ngom spent two years in Germany: In the 2015-16 season, he played in the Bamberg youth set up. In 2016-17, he had a double license to compete for the Nürnberg Falcons U19 team and the Longhorns Herzogenaurach men's team, competing in the country's fourth-tier division Regionalliga. While in Germany, he worked out with Geschwindner.

In 2017, Ryerson head coach Roy Rana saw Ngom at the SEED Project's Hoop Forum in Dakar, an event featuring top high school players in Senegal. Ngom obtained a visa to attend school in Canada and chose to play basketball under Rana at U Sports program Ryerson, despite also drawing interest from National Collegiate Athletic Association programs.

== College career ==
=== Ryerson ===
Ngom played three years of basketball for U Sports program Ryerson, leading the Rams to a 55–15 record. When he joined the team, at age 19, he stood about 2.18 m (7 ft 2 in). As a freshman, Ngom averaged 5.8 points, 4.2 rebounds and 1.3 blocks per game and was named to the Ontario University Athletics (OUA) All-Rookie Team. In the offseason, he gained almost 13.7 kg (30 lb), which helped him improve as a sophomore. In August 2018, Ngom became the first player from a Canadian university to participate in the Nike Skills Challenge. In his sophomore season, he averaged 11.3 points, 5.6 rebounds and 2.3 blocks per game. He set Ryerson's single-season blocks record and tied a program record with a field goal percentage of 63.8 percent in the regular season. After the season, Ngom declared for the 2019 NBA draft, before returning to school. He missed the first six games of his junior season with an injury. On 11 January 2020, Ngom grabbed a program-record 23 rebounds to go with 23 points in an 87–82 win over Western. He finished the season averaging 16.7 points, 11.5 rebounds and 1.9 blocks per game and was named a Second Team OUA All-Star. In 60 career games at Ryerson, Ngom averaged 10.6 points, 6.6 rebounds and 1.8 blocks per game, shooting 61 percent from the field and led the team to a 55-15 record.

=== Florida State ===
On 10 July 2020, Ngom signed a grant-in-aid agreement to play basketball for Florida State. He averaged 0.9 points and 0.9 rebounds per game (7 contests) as a senior. Ngom opted to return to Florida State for his fifth season of eligibility, granted due to the COVID-19 pandemic. On 27 November 2021, he strained his knee in practice, forcing him to miss several games. In the 2021-22 season, Ngom appeared in nine games, scoring 6 points per outing, while pulling down 1.9 rebounds a game.

== Professional career ==
Ngom got his first professional experience with CD Póvoa of the Liga Portuguesa de Basquetebol in Portugal in 2022-23, averaging 11.1 points and 6.1 rebounds per game. On July 3, 2023, he signed with AB Castelló of the Spanish second-tier league LEB Oro. In June 2025, he signed for Gipuzkoa Basket of the Primera FEB.
