= 2026 U Sports Men's Basketball Championship =

Canadian university basketball championship

- Season: 2025-26
- Teams: Eight
- Finals site: Jack Simpson Gymnasium; Calgary, Alberta
- Champions: Carleton Ravens (18th title)
- Runner-up: Bishop's Gaiters
- Winning coach: Taffe Charles (4th title)
- Tournament MVP: Aubrey Dorey-Havens (Carleton)
- Television: CBC Gem

The 2026 U Sports Men's Final 8 Basketball Tournament was held March 6–8, 2026, in Calgary, Alberta, to determine a national champion for the 2025–26 U Sports men's basketball season. The sixth-seeded Carleton Ravens defeated the fifth-seeded Bishop's Gaiters 78–75 to the 18th national title in program history.

== Host ==
The tournament was hosted by the University of Calgary at the school's Jack Simpson Gymnasium. This was the fifth time that Calgary had hosted the tournament with the first taking place in 1966 and the most recent taking place in 1980.

== Participating teams ==
The seeding for teams was announced on March 1, 2026, with the Bishop's Gaiters being awarded the at-large berth.

Seed	Team	Qualified	Record	Last	Total
1	Victoria Vikes	Canada West Champion	17–3	2025	9
2	TMU Bold	OUA Champion	17–5	None	0
3	Laval Rouge et Or	RSEQ Champion	13–3	2024	1
4	Acadia Axemen	AUS Champion	12–8	1977	3
5	Bishop's Gaiters	RSEQ Finalist (At-large berth)	13–3	1998	1
6	Carleton Ravens	OUA Finalist	17–5	2023	17
7	UBC Thunderbirds	Canada West Finalist	15–5	1972	2
8	Calgary Dinos	Canada West Quarterfinalist (Host)	12–8	2018	1

== Championship bracket ==
First Round: March 6
1	Victoria Vikes	100
8	Calgary Dinos	86
4	Acadia Axemen	85
5	Bishop's Gaiters	98
2	TMU Bold	97
7	UBC Thunderbirds	91
3	Laval Rouge et Or	69
6	Carleton Ravens	85

Semi-Finals: March 7
1	Victoria Vikes	65
5	Bishop's Gaiters	66
2	TMU Bold	52
6	Carleton Ravens	58

Gold Medal Game: March 8
5	Bishop's Gaiters	75
6	Carleton Ravens	78
Bronze Medal Game: March 8
1	Victoria Vikes	85
2	TMU Bold	81

== Consolation bracket ==
Semi-Finals: March 7
4	Acadia Axemen	88
8	Calgary Dinos	77
3	Laval Rouge et Or	83
7	UBC Thunderbirds	75

Fifth Place Game: March 8
3	Laval Rouge et Or	85
4	Acadia Axemen	76
