= 2018 U Sports Women's Volleyball Championship =

Canadian university volleyball championship

- Season: 2017–18
- Teams: Eight
- Finals site: PEPS gymnase Quebec City, Quebec
- Champions: Ryerson Rams (1st title)
- Runner-up: Alberta Pandas
- Winning coach: Dustin Reid (1st title)
- Championship MVP: Theanna Vernon (Ryerson Rams)

The 2018 U Sports Women's Volleyball Championship was held March 16–18, 2018, in Quebec City, Quebec, to determine a national champion for the 2017–18 U Sports women's volleyball season. The tournament was played at PEPS gymnase at Université Laval. It was the seventh time that Laval had hosted the tournament with the most recent occurring in 2011.

The OUA Champion Ryerson Rams completed a perfect season, finishing with a 19–0 regular season record, 3–0 OUA playoff record, and 3–0 U Sports championship record to claim the first national championship in program history and in school history.

== Participating teams ==
Seed	Team	Qualified	Record	Last	Total
1	Calgary Dinos	Canada West Champion	21–3	2004	4
2	Montreal Carabins	RSEQ Champion	18–2	None	0
3	UBC Thunderbirds	Canada West Finalist	20–4	2017	11
4	Ryerson Rams	OUA Champion	19–0	None	0
5	UBC Okanagan Heat	Canada West Semifinalist	19–5	None	0
6	Dalhousie Tigers	AUS Champion	19–1	1982	1
7	Alberta Pandas	Canada West Semifinalist	15–9	2007	7
8	Laval Rouge et Or	RSEQ Finalist (Host)	14–6	2006	1

== Championship bracket ==
First Round: March 16
1	Calgary Dinos	3
8	Laval Rouge et Or	0
4	Ryerson Rams	3
5	UBC Okanagan Heat	2
2	Montreal Carabins	2
7	Alberta Pandas	3
3	UBC Thunderbirds	3
6	Dalhousie Tigers	2

Semi-Finals: March 17
1	Calgary Dinos	1
4	Ryerson Rams	3
7	Alberta Pandas	3
3	UBC Thunderbirds	1

Gold Medal Game: March 18
4	Ryerson Rams	3
7	Alberta Pandas	1
Bronze Medal Game: March 18
1	Calgary Dinos	1
3	UBC Thunderbirds	3

== Consolation bracket ==
Semi-Finals: March 17
2	Montreal Carabins	3
6	Dalhousie Tigers	0
5	UBC Okanagan Heat	1
8	Laval Rouge et Or	3

Fifth Place Game: March 18
2	Montreal Carabins	3
8	Laval Rouge et Or	0
