= Patrick Tatham =

Canadian basketball player and coach (born 1984)

McMaster Marauders
- Position: Head coach
- League: U Sports

Personal information
- Born: January 20, 1984 (age 42) Toronto, Ontario, Canada

Career information
- High school: Chinguacousy (Brampton, Ontario)
- College: Cleveland State (2003–2007)
- Coaching career: 2003–present

Career history

Playing
- 2007–2008: Sion Herens Basket
- 2009: Itzehoe Eagles

Coaching
- 2009–2010: Stoneridge Prep
- 2010–2015: Ryerson (assistant)
- 2015–2016: Ryerson
- 2016–2017: Maine Red Claws (assistant)
- 2017–present: McMaster

Career highlights
- As head coach: OUA champion (2016); CIS Coach of the Year (2016)

Patrick Bruce Tatham (born January 20, 1984) is a Canadian basketball coach and former professional basketball player, currently working as the head coach of the McMaster Marauders.

== Playing career ==
After playing at Chinguacousy Secondary School in Brampton, Ontario, Tatham enrolled at Cleveland State University. During his four-year stint with the Cleveland State Vikings men's basketball (2003 - 2007), he appeared in 101 games, averaging 6.4 points and 5.2 rebounds per contest. Upon graduation, Tatham played professional basketball overseas. In the 2007–08 season, he had a brief stint at Swiss club Sion Herens Basket. In January 2009, he signed with the Itzehoe Eagles of Germany, followed by stints in Qatar and Syria.

He was a member of the Canadian Junior National Team from 2002 to 2004.

== Coaching career ==
Tatham served as head coach at Stoneridge Preparatory School in Simi Valley, California before joining the staff of the Ryerson University men's basketball team. After serving as director of basketball operations, he moved to assistant coach and stayed on that job until 2015. Tatham was the manager of Team Canada at the 2013 Universiade Games in Russia and the Canadian Junior Men's National Team at the 2012 FIBA Americas U18 Championship in Brazil.

In 2015–16, Tatham was the interim head coach at Ryerson, replacing Roy Rana who had taken a sabbatical. Tatham coached the Rams to a 17–2 regular season record and a first-place finish in the OUA, earning OUA Coach of the Year honours.

He served as an assistant coach for the Maine Red Claws of the NBA Development League in 2016–17, while being on a professional development leave from his position with the Ryerson Rams. In May 2017, he was named head coach of McMaster University's men's basketball team. Tatham became also a member of the coaching staff of Canada's men's national team.

== Private life ==
He is the brother of Tamara Tatham and Alisha Tatham.
