= 2018 U Sports Men's Basketball Championship =

Canadian university basketball championship

- Season: 2017-18
- Teams: Eight
- Finals site: Scotiabank Centre; Halifax, Nova Scotia
- Champions: Calgary Dinos (1st title)
- Runner-up: Ryerson Rams

The 2018 U Sports men's basketball championship was the 56th edition of the U Sports men's basketball championship, a postseason tournament to determine the national champion of the 2017–18 U Sports men's basketball season. The tournament was held March 8–11, 2018 in Halifax, Nova Scotia. It was hosted by Acadia University, which also hosted in 1971 on campus in Wolfville, Nova Scotia. The tournament was held at the Scotiabank Centre for the second consecutive year, and was the 31st time the tournament had been played in Halifax.

For the first time in eight years—and just the third time in the past 16—a team other than the Carleton Ravens claimed the national title. The Calgary Dinos edged out the Ryerson Rams to take the championship. It was the first national title for Calgary, and the second consecutive appearance (and loss) in the final game for Ryerson. Carleton took the bronze medal over the McGill Redmen. While the Ravens took some consolation in that, Carleton basketball was buoyed later the same day (March 11), when its women's team claimed its first-ever national crown, in Regina.

== Tournament seeds ==
Seed	Team	Qualified	Regular season record/ Playoff record
1	Carleton Ravens	OUA champion	23–0 / 3–0
2	Calgary Dinos	Canada West champion	16–4 / 5–0
3	McGill Redmen	RSEQ champion	14–2 / 2–0
4	Alberta Golden Bears	Canada West finalist	19–1 / 4–1
5	Ryerson Rams	OUA finalist	17–6 / 3–1
6	UNB Varsity Reds	AUS champion	16–4 / 3–0
7	Brock Badgers	OUA semi-finalist (At-large berth)	21–3 / 1–1
8	Acadia Axemen	AUS quarter-finalist (Host)	15–5 / 0–1

== Results ==
=== Bracket ===
Championship Bracket

Quarter-Finals; March 8
1	Carleton Ravens	81
8	Acadia Axemen	64
4	Alberta Golden Bears	62
5	Ryerson Rams	88
2	Calgary Dinos	78
7	Brock Badgers	76
3	McGill Redmen	88
6	UNB Varsity Reds	57

Semi-Finals; March 10
1	Carleton Ravens	76
5	Ryerson Rams	84
2	Calgary Dinos	65
3	McGill Redmen	43

Final; March 11
2	Calgary Dinos	79
5	Ryerson Rams	77
Bronze Medal Game: March 11
1	Carleton Ravens	76
3	McGill Redmen	71

Consolation Bracket

Semi-Finals; March 10
4	Alberta Golden Bears	87
8	Acadia Axemen	92
6	UNB Varsity Reds	65
7	Brock Badgers	81

Fifth place March 11
7	Brock Badgers	94
8	Acadia Axemen	57

=== Quarter-finals ===
U Sports

Thursday, March 8
12:00 pm AST

Box score

#3 McGill Redmen 88, #6 UNB Varsity Reds 57
Scoring by quarter: 16–16, 29–14, 21–12, 22–15
Pts: D. Ogundokun – 17; Rebs: N. Daoust, D. Pieper – 5 Asts: A. Paquin – 3	Pts: J. Masters – 19; Rebs: I. Doumbouya – 6 Asts: J. Masters – 4

Scotiabank Centre – Halifax, Nova Scotia
Attendance: 500
Referees: Perry Stothert, Derek Sorensen, Brenden Byrne

U Sports

Thursday, March 8
2:00 pm AST

Box score

#2 Calgary Dinos 78, #7 Brock Badgers 76
Scoring by quarter: 22–12, 16–17, 21–23, 19–24
Pts: M. Diawara – 19; Rebs: J. Verrone – 8 Asts: D. Kapinga – 6	Pts: J. Simpson – 24; Rebs: J. Simpson – 12; Asts: T. Brown – 4

Scotiabank Centre – Halifax, Nova Scotia
Referees: Paul Hansen, Geoff Astles, Reid Keynon

U Sports

Thursday, March 8
6:00 pm AST

Box score

#4 Alberta Golden Bears 62, #5 Ryerson Rams 88
Scoring by quarter: 21–31, 13–15, 15–26, 13–16
Pts: M. Gueye – 12; Rebs: A. Kelly – 5 Asts: B. Clarke, M. Gueye – 3	Pts: M. Diressa – 25; Rebs: J. Mukama – 9 Asts: M. Diressa – 7

Scotiabank Centre – Halifax, Nova Scotia
Referees: Matt Boyle, Michael Weiland, Nate Saunders

U Sports

Thursday, March 8
8:00 pm AST

Box score

#1 Carleton Ravens 81, #8 Acadia Axemen 64
Scoring by quarter: 22–18, 17–18, 15–16, 27–12
Pts: E. Nissen – 18; Rebs: E. Nissen – 17; Asts: 4 players – 2	Pts: E. Ekiyor – 25; Rebs: Y. Joseph, C. Smythe – 8 Asts: Y. Joseph, M. Tutu – 7

Scotiabank Centre – Halifax, Nova Scotia
Referees: Tanner Cerbo, Riley Kerosen, Max Audette

=== Consolation Semi-Finals ===
U Sports

Saturday, March 10
11:00 am AST

Box score

#6 UNB Varsity Reds 65, #7 Brock Badgers 81
Scoring by quarter: 9–17, 16–23, 16–18, 24–23
Pts: J. Masters – 16; Rebs: J. Masters – 8 Asts: D. Pitcher – 4	Pts: J. Simpson – 29; Rebs: J. Simpson – 11; Asts: I. Ngom, J. Simpson – 3

Scotiabank Centre – Halifax, Nova Scotia
Referees: Paul Hansen, Riley Kerrison, Nate Saunders

U Sports

Saturday, March 10
8:00 pm AST

Box score

#4 Alberta Golden Bears 87, #8 Acadia Axemen 92
Scoring by quarter: 31–23, 21–22, 16–23, 19–24
Pts: A. Waddoups – 26; Rebs: M. Gueye – 10; Asts: A. Waddoups – 5	Pts: N. De Palma – 24; Rebs: E. Nissen – 6 Asts: B. Miller – 10

Scotiabank Centre – Halifax, Nova Scotia

=== Semi-finals ===
SN360, U Sports

Saturday, March 10
2:00 pm AST

Box score

#2 Calgary Dinos 65, #3 McGill Redmen 43
Scoring by quarter: 16–15, 16–7, 20–15, 13–6
Pts: D. Kapinga – 19; Rebs: C. Foreman – 10; Asts: M. Diawara – 4	Pts: A. Paquin – 10; Rebs: N. Daoust – 8 Asts: D. Ogundokun – 2

Scotiabank Centre – Halifax, Nova Scotia
Referees: Matt Boyle, Geoff Asteles, Taylor Cervo

SN360, U Sports

Saturday, March 10
6:00 pm AST

Box score

#1 Carleton Ravens 76, #5 Ryerson Rams 84
Scoring by quarter: 11–18, 25–18, 20–27, 20–21
Pts: Y. Joseph – 20; Rebs: E. Ekiyor, Y. Joseph – 7 Asts: M. Tutu – 4	Pts: M. Diressa – 28; Rebs: A. Voll – 7 Asts: M. Diressa – 6

Scotiabank Centre – Halifax, Nova Scotia
Attendance: 3,568
Referees: Michael Weiland, Reid Kenyon, Perry Stothart

=== Fifth place ===
U Sports

Sunday, March 11
12:00 pm AST

Box score

#7 Brock Badgers 94, #8 Acadia Axemen 57
Scoring by quarter: 22–18, 23–10, 26–16, 23–13
Pts: B. Miller – 14; Rebs: B. Miller – 6 Asts: B. Miller – 7	Pts: J. Simpson – 34; Rebs: D. Elgadi – 10; Asts: J. Simpson – 5

Scotiabank Centre – Halifax, Nova Scotia
Referees: Nate Saunders, Brenden Byrne, Derek Sorensen

=== Third place ===
U Sports

Sunday, March 11
2:00 pm AST

Box score

#1 Carleton Ravens 76, #3 McGill Redmen 71
Scoring by quarter: 12–9, 12–25, 24–18, 28–19
Pts: A. Paquin – 17; Rebs: D. Ogundokun – 6 Asts: A. Paquin – 5	Pts: E. Ekiyor – 21; Rebs: E. Ekiyor – 8 Asts: M. Tutu – 6

Scotiabank Centre – Halifax, Nova Scotia
Attendance: 1,000
Referees: Riley Kerrison, Paul Hansen, Max Audette

=== Final ===
SN360, U Sports

Sunday, March 11
6:00 pm AST

Box score

#2 Calgary Dinos 79, #5 Ryerson Rams 77
Scoring by quarter: 21–18, 18–12, 18–21, 22–26
Pts: D. Kapinga – 25; Rebs: M. Diawara – 10; Asts: M. Diawara, D. Kapinga – 6	Pts: M. Diressa – 28; Rebs: J. Mukama – 6 Asts: M. Charvis – 9

Scotiabank Centre – Halifax, Nova Scotia
Referees: Michael Weiland, Geoff Askells, Tanner Cervo

== See also ==
- 2018 U Sports Women's Basketball Championship
- 2018 NCAA Division I men's basketball tournament
