= 2016 CIS Men's Basketball Championship =

Canadian university basketball championship

- Season: 2015-16
- Teams: Eight
- Finals site: Doug Mitchell Thunderbird Sports Centre; Vancouver, British Columbia
- Champions: Carleton Ravens (12th title)
- Runner-up: Calgary Dinos

The 2016 CIS Men's Basketball Championship was held March 17–20, 2016 in Vancouver, British Columbia, to determine a national champion for the 2015–16 CIS men's basketball season. hosted by the University of British Columbia at the Doug Mitchell Thunderbird Sports Centre. This was the second time UBC hosted, and the third time the tournament was played in B.C.

In dynastic fashion, the Carleton Ravens won their sixth straight title, their 12th in 14 years, this time over the Calgary Dinos. The Ryerson Rams, ranked number one in the country going into the tournament (a first in any sport for the school), took the bronze medal over the Dalhousie Tigers in a second consecutive third-place finish. Carleton set a record with the win, earning the most national championships in men's basketball than any top division college in Canada or the United States. (Carleton and UCLA were tied with 11 wins, prior to this.)

All tournament games were shown live online via the CIS website (using Stretch Internet), with the semi-final and final games on a pay-per-view basis. The semi-final and final games were on television's Sportsnet 360 and on its online service.

This proved to be the last Men's Final 8 branded as a CIS championship. On October 20, 2016, Canadian Interuniversity Sport, the country's governing body for university athletics and the organizer of the Final 8, changed its name to U Sports.

== Participating teams ==
Seed	Team	Qualified	Regular season record/ Playoff record
1	Ryerson Rams	Ontario University Champion	17-2/3-0
2	Carleton Ravens	Ontario University Runner-Up	16-3/2-1
3	Ottawa Gee-Gees	At-Large	17-2/2-1
4	Calgary Dinos	Canada West Champion	17-3/4-0
5	McGill Redmen	Quebec University Champion	12-4/2-0
6	Dalhousie Tigers	Atlantic University Champion	13-7/2-0
7	Thompson Rivers WolfPack	Canada West Runner-Up	16-4/4-1
8	UBC Thunderbirds	Host (Canada West 3rd Place)	16-4/3-1

== Championship Bracket ==
First Round: March 17
1	Ryerson Rams	109 (OT)
8	UBC Thunderbirds	101
4	Calgary Dinos	72
5	McGill Redmen	69
3	Ottawa Gee-Gees	83
6	Dalhousie Tigers	87
2	Carleton Ravens	91
7	Thompson Rivers WolfPack	75

Semi-Finals: March 19
1	Ryerson Rams	87
4	Calgary Dinos	98
2	Carleton Ravens	76
6	Dalhousie Tigers	66

Final: March 20
2	Carleton Ravens	101
4	Calgary Dinos	79
Bronze Medal Game: March 20
1	Ryerson Rams	85
6	Dalhousie Tigers	78

== Consolation Bracket ==
Semi-Finals: March 18
3	Ottawa Gee-Gees	78
7	Thompson Rivers WolfPack	77
5	McGill Redmen	68
8	UBC Thunderbirds	69

Fifth Place Game: March 19
3	Ottawa Gee-Gees	76
8	UBC Thunderbirds	93
