= 2017 U Sports Men's Basketball Championship =

Canadian university basketball championship

- Season: 2016-17
- Teams: Eight
- Finals site: Scotiabank Centre; Halifax, Nova Scotia
- Champions: Carleton Ravens (7th title)
- Runner-up: Ryerson Rams

The 2017 U Sports Men's Basketball Championship was held March 9–12, 2017 in Halifax, Nova Scotia, to determine a national champion for the 2016–17 U Sports men's basketball season. It was hosted by Dalhousie University at the Scotiabank Centre, the first time since 1987 that Dalhousie hosted the tournament.

The Carleton Ravens won their seventh straight title, their 13th in 15 years, this time over the Ryerson Rams, who came into the tournament ranked number one in the country. The Dalhousie Tigers took their first ever bronze medal by defeating the McGill Redmen. Carleton extended its record number of men's national basketball championships, more than any top division college in Canada or the United States.

All tournament games were shown live online via the U Sports website (using Stretch Internet). The semi-final and final games were on television's Sportsnet 360 and on its online service.

This marked the first Men's Final 8 branded as a U Sports championship.

== Participating teams ==
Seed	Team	Qualified	Regular season record/ Playoff record
1	Ryerson Rams	OUA Champion	17-2/3-0
2	Carleton Ravens	OUA Finalist	19-0/2-1
3	McGill Redmen	RSEQ Champion	13-3/2-0
4	Alberta Golden Bears	Canada West Champion	14-6/4-1
5	Dalhousie Tigers	AUS Champion (Host)	16-4/3-0
6	Manitoba Bisons	Canada West Finalist	12-8/5-1
7	Calgary Dinos	Canada West Bronze (At-large berth)	16-4/3-1
8	Saint Mary's Huskies	AUS Finalist	13-7/2-1

== Championship Bracket ==
First Round: March 9
1	Ryerson Rams	79
8	Saint Mary's Huskies	70
4	Alberta Golden Bears	65
5	Dalhousie Tigers	67
2	Carleton Ravens	85
7	Calgary Dinos	69
3	McGill Redmen	63
6	Manitoba Bisons	53

Semi-Finals: March 11
1	Ryerson Rams	59
5	Dalhousie Tigers	58
2	Carleton Ravens	74
3	McGill Redmen	58

Final: March 12
1	Ryerson Rams	69
2	Carleton Ravens	78
Bronze Medal Game: March 12
3	McGill Redmen	63
5	Dalhousie Tigers	69

== Consolation Bracket ==
Semi-Finals: March 10
4	Alberta Golden Bears	93
8	Saint Mary's Huskies	98 (OT)
6	Manitoba Bisons	84
7	Calgary Dinos	92

Fifth Place Game: March 11
7	Calgary Dinos	96
8	Saint Mary's Huskies	65
