= 2008 CIS Men's Basketball Championship =

Canadian university basketball championship

The 2008 CIS Men's Final 8 Basketball Tournament was held March 14–16, 2008. For the first time, it was held at Scotiabank Place in Ottawa, Ontario and was hosted by the Carleton Ravens.

The tournament will be remembered for Acadia's upset over Carleton in the semi-final, ending their run of five consecutive national titles. Brock won their first title since 1992.

== Bracket ==
Elite Eight
1	Carleton Ravens	66
8	Alberta Golden Bears	57
4	Laval Rouge et Or	77
5	Acadia Axemen	85
2	UBC Thunderbirds	78
7	Brock Badgers	83
3	Saint Mary's Huskies	70
6	Western Ontario Mustangs	75

Semi-finals
1	Carleton Ravens	80
5	Acadia Axemen	82 (2OT)
6	Western Ontario Mustangs	75
7	Brock Badgers	85

National Championship
5	Acadia Axemen	61
7	Brock Badgers	64
