= 2027 U Sports Women's Basketball Championship =

Canadian university basketball championship

2027 U Sports Women's Final 8
- Season: 2026–27
- Teams: Eight
- Finals site: Scotiabank Centre; Halifax, Nova Scotia

The 2027 U Sports Women's Final 8 Basketball Tournament is scheduled to be held March 11 to March 14, 2027, in Halifax, Nova Scotia, to determine a national champion for the 2026–27 U Sports women's basketball season.

== Host ==
The tournament is scheduled to be hosted by Acadia University at Scotiabank Centre. This will be the second time that Halifax has hosted the tournament with the other occurring in 1980, hosted by Dalhousie University. It will take place at the same time as the 2027 U Sports Men's Basketball Championship which is also being held at Scotiabank Centre.

== Scheduled teams ==
- Canada West Representative
- OUA Representative
- RSEQ Representative
- AUS Representative
- Host (Acadia Axewomen)
- Three additional berths
