= 2015 CIS Men's Basketball Championship =

Canadian university basketball championship

The 2015 CIS Men's Final 8 Basketball Tournament was held March 12–15, 2015, in Toronto, Ontario. It was hosted by Ryerson University (now Toronto Metropolitan University) at the Mattamy Athletic Centre at the Gardens, marking the first time Ryerson had hosted, and the first time the tournament had been played in Toronto in its 53-year history. The 2015 tournament saw gold, silver and bronze medals awarded, respectively, to Carleton, Ottawa, and Ryerson. Carleton accepted the W. P. McGee Trophy, awarded to the national champions. This marked the fifth straight national title for Carleton—its 11th in 13 years—and the first team in CIS history to win 11 national championships.

== Participating teams ==
Seed	Team	Qualified	Regular season record/ Playoff record
1	Carleton Ravens	Ontario University Champion	17-2/3-0
2	Windsor Lancers	Ontario University Finalist	15-5/3-1
3	Ottawa Gee-Gees	Ontario University Bronze Medallist	18-1/2-1
4	Victoria Vikes	Canada West Champion	15-5/4-0
5	Dalhousie Tigers	Atlantic University Champion	10-10/3-0
6	Bishop's Gaiters	Quebec University Champion	8-8/2-0
7	Ryerson Rams	Host (OUA 4th Place)	17-2/1-2
8	Saskatchewan Huskies	Canada West Finalist	15-5/3-2

== Championship Bracket ==
First Round: March 12
1	Carleton Ravens	90
8	Saskatchewan Huskies	50
4	Victoria Vikes	57
5	Dalhousie Tigers	56
2	Windsor Lancers	68
7	Ryerson Rams	82
3	Ottawa Gee-Gees	91 (OT)
6	Bishop's Gaiters	85

Semi-Finals: March 14
1	Carleton Ravens	83
4	Victoria Vikes	74
3	Ottawa Gee-Gees	84
7	Ryerson Rams	75

Final: March 15
1	Carleton Ravens	93
3	Ottawa Gee-Gees	46
Bronze Medal Game: March 15
4	Victoria Vikes	68
7	Ryerson Rams	82

== Consolation Bracket ==
Semi-Finals: March 13
2	Windsor Lancers	91
6	Bishop's Gaiters	80
5	Dalhousie Tigers	79
8	Saskatchewan Huskies	90

Fifth Place Game: March 14
2	Windsor Lancers	94
8	Saskatchewan Huskies	99

== See also ==
2015 CIS Women's Basketball Championship
