= 2021 U Sports Men's Basketball Championship =

Canadian university basketball championship

The 2021 U Sports Men's Basketball Championship was scheduled to be held March 11–14, 2021 in Halifax, Nova Scotia, to determine a national champion for the 2020–21 U Sports men's basketball season. However, on October 15, 2020, it was announced that the championship was cancelled due to the COVID-19 pandemic.

== Host ==
It was scheduled to be hosted by St. Francis Xavier University, which would have been the second time that they had hosted the championship, with the other being held in 1968. Sports & Entertainment Atlantic (S|E|A) was a production partner for the event, which would have been their fourth year of coordinating the championship game. The tournament would have been held at the Scotiabank Centre for the fourth time in five years and it would have been the 33rd time that the tournament will be played in Halifax.
