= 2012 CIS Men's Basketball Championship =

Canadian university basketball championship

The 2012 CIS Men's Final 8 Basketball Tournament was held March 9–11, 2012. It was the second of two consecutive CIS Championships to be held at the Halifax Metro Centre before moving to Scotiabank Place in Ottawa for two years. The defending champions were the Carleton Ravens, who won their 7th title in nine years and who return to the tournament with an undefeated record of 31-0 in CIS play. They were joined by six other qualifiers and one wild card team. This was the 50th CIS Men's basketball championship.

The top-seeded Carleton Ravens defeated the second-seeded Alberta Golden Bears by a score of 86-67, winning their second consecutive W. P. McGee Trophy and their record-tying eighth overall. The Ravens are now tied with the Victoria Vikes for most CIS men's basketball championships overall.

The tournament was broadcast by EastLink TV which made the feed available to other cable companies and by NBA TV Canada.

== List of participating teams ==
Seed	Team	Qualified
1	Carleton Ravens	Ontario University Champion
2	Alberta Golden Bears	Canada West Champion
3	Concordia Stingers	Quebec University Champion
4	Lakehead Thunderwolves	Wildcard
5	Fraser Valley Cascades	Canada West Finalist
6	St. Francis Xavier X-Men	Atlantic University Finalist
7	Ryerson Rams	Ontario University Finalist
8	Acadia Axemen	Atlantic University Champion

== Championship Bracket ==
First Round: March 9
1	Carleton Ravens	82
8	Acadia Axemen	68
4	Lakehead Thunderwolves	71
5	Fraser Valley Cascades	83
2	Alberta Golden Bears	81
7	Ryerson Rams	52
3	Concordia Stingers	82
6	St. Francis Xavier X-Men	98

Semi-Finals: March 10
1	Carleton Ravens	83
5	Fraser Valley Cascades	65
2	Alberta Golden Bears	91
6	St. Francis Xavier X-Men	83

Final: March 11
1	Carleton Ravens	86
2	Alberta Golden Bears	67
Bronze Medal: March 11
5	Fraser Valley Cascades	86
6	St. Francis Xavier X-Men	89

== Consolation Bracket ==
Consolation Semi-Finals: March 10
4	Lakehead Thunderwolves (30-4)	75
8	Acadia Axemen (20-14)	84
3	Concordia Stingers (23-7)	80
7	Ryerson Rams (18-14)	84

Consolation Final: March 11
7	Ryerson Rams (19-14)	83
8	Acadia Axemen (21-14)	90

Note: All records are against CIS competition only.
