= David DeAveiro =

Canadian basketball coach

Calgary Surge
- Position: Head Coach

Personal information
- Born: December 8, 1963 (age 62) Toronto, Canada

Career information
- College: Ottawa
- NBA draft: 1989: undrafted

Career history

Coaching
- 2001-2010: University of Ottawa
- 2010-2020: McGill University
- 2020-2024: Ottawa Blackjacks (assistant)
- 2025: Ottawa Blackjacks
- 2020-present: Toronto Metropolitan University
- 2026: Calgary Surge (assistant)
- 2026-present: Calgary Surge

David DeAveiro (born December 8, 1963) is a Canadian professional basketball coach who currently serves as the interim head coach of the Calgary Surge in the Canadian Elite Basketball League. He is also currently the head coach of the TMU men's basketball team at Toronto Metropolitan University. DeAveiro is a native of Toronto, Canada. He played college basketball for the Ottawa Gee-Gees for five seasons from 1984 to 1989.

== Coaching career ==
DeAveiro was previously the coach at University of Ottawa for nine seasons and at McGill University for 10 seasons. In April 2020, he was named head coach of the TMU men's basketball team.

From 2020 to 2024, DeAveiro served as an assistant coach for the Ottawa Blackjacks and as head coach during the summer of 2025.

In 2023, DeAveiro was an assistant coach for Team Canada at the 2023 Globl Jam event held at the Mattamy Athletic Centre.

In April 2026, it was announced that DeAveiro would be joining the Calgary Surge as an assistant coach. He became interim head coach of the Calgary Surge after Perry Huang was fired on June 8, 2026.

As of 2026, DeAveiro is in his fifth season as head coach at Toronto Metropolitan University.
