= TMU Bold =

Toronto Metropolitan University athletic teams

- University: Toronto Metropolitan University
- Association: U Sports
- Conference: Ontario University Athletics
- Athletic director: Nick Asquini
- Location: Toronto, Ontario
- Varsity teams: 8
- Arena: Mattamy Athletic Centre (hockey, basketball, volleyball)
- Soccer stadium: Downsview Park Sports Centre
- Colours: Blue, Gold, and Silver
- Mascot: Frankie the Falcon
- Website: www.tmubold.ca

The TMU Bold, formerly known as the Ryerson Rams, are the varsity athletic teams that represent Toronto Metropolitan University (formerly known as Ryerson University) in Toronto, Ontario, Canada. Toronto Metropolitan University operates 8 men's and women's varsity teams that compete provincially as part of Ontario University Athletics (OUA) and nationally as part of U Sports.

The team mascot is Frankie the Falcon, who can be seen at most major events.

== Teams ==
Men's sports	Women's sports
Basketball	Basketball
Hockey	Hockey
Soccer	Soccer
Volleyball	Volleyball

=== Basketball ===
==== Men's basketball ====
TMU Bold men's basketball program was led through its most successful run between 2009 and 2019 by head coach Roy Rana before he left the Rams following the 2018–19 OUA season to accept a role as an Assistant Coach for the Sacramento Kings. Across their ten year run, the Rams finished with a 137–55 record, back to back OUA Wilson Cup (basketball) titles in 2016 and 2017 and four straight trips to the Wilson Cup Final against the Carleton Ravens between 2015 and 2019. The 2020–21 Rams Men's Basketball team was led by head coach David DeAveiro who joined the Rams in May 2020 after spending the previous 10 seasons as the head coach of the McGill University Men's Basketball Team. In 2015, the Mattamy Athletic Centre hosted the 2015 CIS Men's Basketball Championship in which the Rams won the bronze for their first national medal in school history, defeating the Victoria Vikes 82–68. At the 2016 CIS Men's Basketball Championship the Rams entered as the #1 seed following their first Wilson Cup championship but were upset by the Calgary Dinos in the Semi-final 98–87. They defeated the Dalhousie Tigers in the next game to claim their second straight bronze medal. At the 2017 U Sports Men's Basketball Championship the Rams again entered as the #1 seed and reached the National Final for the first time in program history before falling to the Carleton Ravens 78–69. In 2018, the Rams defeated the Ravens in the Semi-final before falling 79–77 to the Calgary Dinos for their second straight silver medal. In the 2019 U Sports Men's Basketball Championship, the Rams fell to the Dinos 67–65 in the Semi-final before once again defeating the Dalhousie Tigers to win the bronze medal.

==== Women's basketball ====
The Bold women's basketball program has had their most successful era between 2012 and 2022. Led by Canada women's national basketball team assistant coach, Carly Clarke, the Rams went 133–57 between 2012 and 2022, and earned their first ever Bronze Baby in 2022 when they completed an undefeated season and also won their second Critelli Cup. The Rams second most successful season came in 2015–16 when whilst being led by OUA Player of the Year, OUA Defensive Player of the Year and CIS National Player of the Year Keneca Pingue-Giles, the Ryerson Rams won their first Critelli Cup defeating the Ottawa Gee-Gees 66–60. At the 2016 CIS Women's Basketball Championship, the Rams reached the National Final before falling to the Saskatchewan Huskies in the final 85–71. The Rams hosted the 2019 U Sports Women's Basketball Championship at Mattamy Athletic Centre in Toronto, finishing the tournament in 5th place. The Rams last reached the Critelli Cup Provincial Final in 2020 falling to the Brock Badgers 84–71. In March 2020, Rams basketball alum Keneca Pingue-Giles was named to the list of the Top 100 U Sports Women’s Basketball Players of the Century (2011–2020).

=== Football ===
Toronto Metropolitan University used to have a football team which was coached, for much of its existence, by former Toronto Argonauts player Ted Toogood, who also served as TMU's first Athletic Director from 1949 to 1961. In 1958, the Rams won the Intermediate Intercollegiate Ontario-Quebec Conference championship. The football program was ended following the 1964 season due to costs, the lack of proper facilities, and poor attendance.

=== Ice hockey ===
==== Men's ice hockey ====
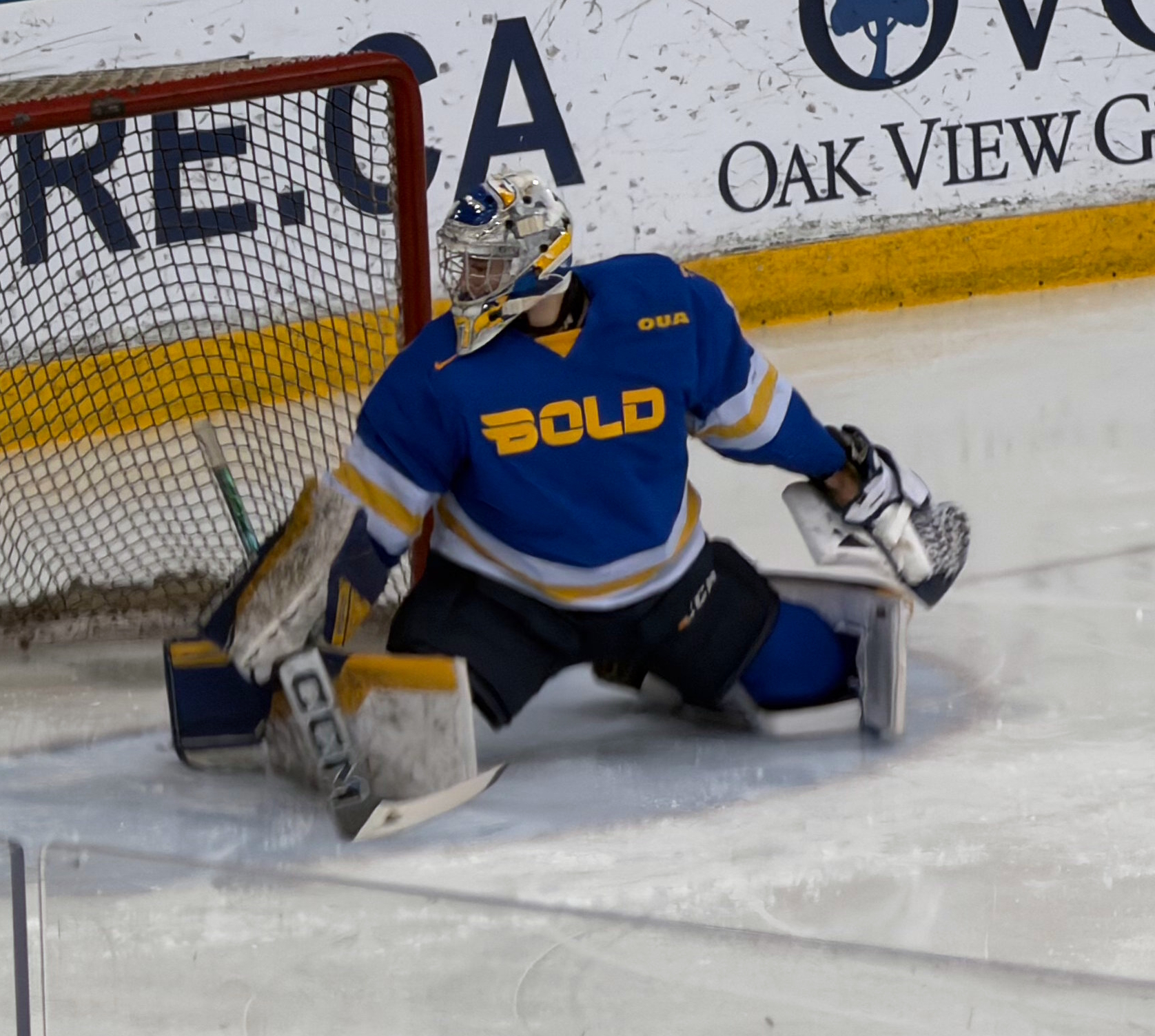
Kai Edmonds holds the program record for career wins (58), and has the second highest career saves (2,297), save percentage (0.923), and appearances (87)

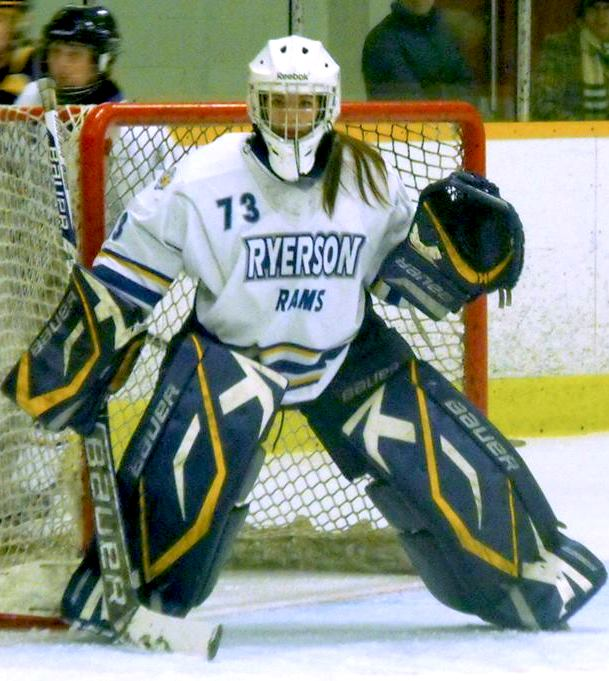
Emma Crawley was the first starting goalie for Ryerson/TMU Women's Hockey when the program joined the OUA in 2011.

The Bold men's ice hockey team, initially called the Ryerson Rams men's ice hockey team, was first fielded on the same year the institute was created in 1948. They joined the OUA in the 1971-72 season, and have played their home games at the Mattamy Athletic Centre in the 2012-13 season. The Bold made it to the Queen's Cup finals in 2024 and 2025, and made it to the national University Cup playoffs in 2022, 2024, and 2025. The men's ice hockey team's first home game of each season is celebrated as the university's homecoming game, since the school hasn't had a football team since 1964.

==== Women's ice hockey ====
The Bold women's ice hockey program first began competing in the OUA in the 2011-12 season and were led by the team's current head coach, Lisa Haley. The team first qualified for the OUA playoffs in 2015 and have also made the playoffs in 2018, 2019, and 2020, with their best finish as OUA Semi-Finalists in the latter two years.

=== Women's volleyball ===
In women's volleyball, the Mattamy Athletic Centre hosted the 2017 U Sports Women's Volleyball Championship in which the Rams placed 7th losing in the Quarterfinals to the eventual silver medalist Alberta Pandas. The Mattamy Athletic Centre hosted the 2018 OUA Quigley Cup in Women's Volleyball which the Rams won, defeating the McMaster Marauders 3-1 in the championship match to win their first Quigley Cup. The Rams moved on to the 2018 U Sports Women's Volleyball Championship and won the U Sports National Title defeating the Alberta Pandas three games to one in the championship match. This was the first U Sports championship title in school history.

== Championships ==
Sport	National titles	Nat. titles winning years	Nat. app.	National championship appearance years	Conference titles	Conf. titles winning years
Basketball (men's)	0	–	7	1999, 2012, 2015, 2016, 2017, 2018, 2019, 2026	3	2016, 2017, 2026
Basketball (women's)	1	2022	4	2015, 2016, 2019, 2020, 2022, 2026	3	2016, 2022, 2026
Ice hockey (men's)	0	–	3	2022, 2024, 2025	0	–
Soccer (men's)	0	–	1	2013	1	2026
Volleyball (women's)	1	2018	4	2002, 2017, 2018, 2019	1	2018
Volleyball (men's)	0	–	1	2016	0	–

== Facilities ==
Until the end of the 2011–12 season, the Rams' basketball and volleyball teams played primarily out of Kerr Hall West Gymnasium, a triple gym in Kerr Hall West. The men's hockey team also played off-campus, using the ice rinks at George Bell Arena in The Junction. The men's and women's soccer teams play their home games at Downsview Park Sports Centre near York University.

In November 2009, then-Ryerson University announced that Maple Leaf Gardens would become the new home of the Rams' athletes. The school partnered with the Canadian Government and supermarket company Loblaws to cover funding for the project. Approximately $20 million was contributed by Ryerson students, $20 million given by the Federal Government and $15 million from Peter Gilligan. In addition, Loblaws, the grocery retailer, made significant financial contributions. The renovation took place over nearly three years, with the ground level hosting a Loblaws Supermarket, connected with the Loblaw Atrium and floor two through four holding the Rams' facilities which include: an NHL-sized ice rink, known as Mattamy Home Ice, a fitness centre as well as a multipurpose court for basketball and volleyball called the Coca-Cola Court. BBB Architects & Stadium Consultants International has designed the new facility - the Mattamy Athletic Centre at the Gardens - which was completed in time for the 2012–13 OUA season.

== Awards and honours ==
The TMU Bold have seen numerous awards given out to student athletes across a multitude of sports.

=== Mens Basketball - U Sports/CIS/CIAU Honours ===
- Aaron Rhooms - U Sports Player of the Year (2025–26)
- Aaron Rhooms - U Sports First Team All-Canadian (2025–26)
- Aaron Rhooms - U Sports First Team All-Canadian (2024–25)
- Aaron Rhooms - U Sports Rookie of the Year (2021–22)
- Tevaun Kokko - U Sports Second Team All-Canadian (2019–20)
- Jean-Victor Mukama - U Sports Second Team All-Canadian (2018–19)
- Ammanuel Diressa - U Sports First Team All-Canadian (2017–18)
- Adika Peter-McNeilly - U Sports First Team All-Canadian (2016–17)
- Aaron Best - U Sports Second Team All-Canadian (2015–16)
- Patrick Tatham - CIS Coach of the Year (2015–16)
- Jahmal Jones - U Sports Second Team All-Canadian (2014–15)
- Jahmal Jones - CIS All-Rookie Team (2010–11)
- Boris Bokovic - CIS All-Roookie Team (2006–07)
- Bill Crowdis - CIS All-Canadian Honourable Mention (1999–00)
- Alex Beason - CIS Second Team All-Canadian (1993–94, 1994–95)

=== Mens Basketball - OUA/OUAA Honours ===
- Aaron Rhooms - OUA Player of the Year (2025–26)
- Aaron Rhooms - OUA First Team All-Star (2025–26)
- Aaron Rhooms - OUA Player of the Year (2024–25)
- Aaron Rhooms - OUA First Team All-Star (2024–25)
- Kevin Toth - OUA All-Rookie Team (2024–25)
- Aaron Rhooms - OUA First Team All-Star (2022–23)
- Aaron Rhooms - OUA Rookie of the Year (2021–22)
- Aaron Rhooms - OUA First Team All-Star (2021–22)
- Aaron Rhooms - OUA All-Rookie Team (2021–22)
- Tanor Ngom - OUA All-Rookie Team (2017–18)
- Keevon Small - OUA All-Rookie Team (2016–17)
- Patrick Tatham - OUA Coach of the Year (2015–16)
- Jean-Victor Mukama - OUA East Rookie of the Year (2013–14)
- Boris Bakovic - OUA East Rookie of the Year (2006–07)
- Terry Haggerty - OUA East Coach of the Year (1999–00)
- John-Michael Nation - OUA East Playoffs Most Valuable Player (1998–99)
- Ben Gorham - OUA East Rookie of the Year (1998–99)
- Alex Beason - OUAA East Most Valuable Player (1993–94)
- Phil Scholte - OUA East Coach of the Year (1980–81)

=== Women's Basketball - U Sports/CIS/CIAU Honours ===
- Myriam Kone - U Sports First-Team All-Canadian (2025–26)
- Catrina Garvey - U Sports Rookie of the Year (2023–24)
- Sofia Paska - U Sports Second Team All-Canadian (2017–18)
- Marrin Scotten - U Sports All-Rookie Team (2017–18)
- Sofia Paska - U Sports Second Team All-Canadian (2016–17)
- Keneca Pingue-Giles - CIS First Team All-Canadian (2015–16)
- Keneca Pingue-Giles - CIS Player of the Year (2015–16)
- Cassandra Nofuente - CIS All-Rookie Team (2012–13)
- Mandi-May Bond - CIS All-Rookie Team (1998–99)
- Darcel Wright - CIS Rookie of the Year (1990–91)

=== Women's Basketball - OUA/OUAA Honours ===
- Hailey Franco-DeRyck - OUA Defensive Player of the Year (2025–26)
- Myriam Kone - OUA First-Team All-Star (2025–26)
- Ella McDonald - OUA All-Rookie Team (2025–26)
- Catrina Garvey - OUA Rookie of the Year (2023–24)
- Catrina Garvey - OUA All-Rookie Team (2023–24)
- Kait Nichols - OUA All-Rookie Team (2022–23)
- Marin Scotten - OUA Rookie of the Year (2017–18)
- Nicole DiDomenico - Joy Bellinger Award of Merit (2016–17)
- Keneca Pingue-Giles - OUA Player of the Year (2015–16)
- Keneca Pingue-Giles - OUA Defensive Player of the Year (2015–16)
- Cassandra Nofuente - OUA East Rookie of the Year (2012–13)
- Lisa Greig - Joy Bellinger Award of Merit (2006–07)
- Ashley Keohan - Joy Bellinger Award of Merit (2003–04)

=== Women's Volleyball - U Sports/CIS/CIAU Honours ===
- Cailin Wark - U Sports First Team All-Canadian (2019–20)
- Jasmine Rivest - U Sports All-Rookie Team (2019–20)
- Theanna Vernon - U Sports Athlete of the Year Finalist (2018–19)
- Theanna Vernon - U Sports First Team All-Canadian (2018–19)
- Lauren Wong - U Sports All-Rookie Team (2018–19)
- Dustin Reid - U Sports Coach of the Year (2018–19)
- Theanna Vernon - U Sports Athlete of the Year Finalist (2017–18)
- Theanna Vernon - U Sports Second Team All-Canadian (2017–18)
- Veronica Livingston - CIS All-Rookie Team (2012–13)
- Chelsea Briscoe - CIS All-Rookie Team (2011–12)

=== Women's Volleyball OUA/OUAA Honours ===
- Cailin Wark - OUA East Most Valuable Player (2019–20)
- Jasmine Rivest - OUA East Rookie of the Year (2019–20)
- Dustin Reid - OUA East Coach of the Year (2019–20)
- Theanna Vernon - OUA East Most Valuable Player (2018–19)
- Lauren Wong - OUA East Rookie of the Year (2018–19)
- Dustin Reid - OUA East Coach of the Year (2018–19)
- Dustin Reid - OUA East Coach of the Year (2017–18)
- Julie Longman - Dale Iwanoczko Award of Merit (2017–18)
- Theanna Vernon - OUA East Rookie of the Year (2014–15)
- Julie Longman - OUA East Libero of the Year (2013–14)
- Dustin Reid - OUA East Coach of the Year (2009–10)
- Brianne Koning - OUA East Rookie of the Year (2004–05)
- Arif Nathoo - OUA East Coach of the Year (1999–00)

== Logos ==
Since Toronto Metropolitan University opened in 1948, the logo for the Rams has changed along with the former technical institute becoming a university. From 1965 until 2010, the Ryerson Rams' logo was a blue outline of a ram's head but in 2011, they updated to a more cartooned version of a ram, in their signature colours of blue and gold.
