= 2002 CIS Men's Basketball Championship =

Canadian university basketball championship

The 2002 CIS Men's Final 8 Basketball Tournament was held March 15-17, 2002. For the 15th straight year, it was played at the Halifax Metro Centre in Halifax, Nova Scotia. The Alberta Golden Bears won their third national championship by beating the Western Ontario Mustangs.

== Championship Bracket ==
First Round: March 15
1	Western Ontario Mustangs	71
8	Victoria Vikes (23-17)	65
4	Laval Rouge et Or	74
5	St. Francis Xavier X-Men	56
2	Alberta Golden Bears	68
7	Saint Mary's Huskies	58
3	Brandon Bobcats	77
6	York Yeomen	81

Semi-Finals: March 16
1	Western Ontario Mustangs	79
4	Laval Rouge et Or	64
2	Alberta Golden Bears	66
6	York Yeomen	59

Final: March 17
1	Western Ontario Mustangs	71
2	Alberta Golden Bears	76

== Consolation Bracket ==
Consolation Semi-Finals: March 16
5	St. Francis Xavier X-Men	65
8	Victoria Vikes	73
3	Brandon Bobcats	74
7	Saint Mary's Huskies	61

Consolation Final: March 17
3	Brandon Bobcats	69
8	Victoria Vikes	63

Note: All records are against CIS competition only.

== Tournament All-Stars ==
- Most Valuable Player: Stephen Parker, Alberta
- All-Stars:
  - Robbie Valpreda, Alberta
  - Jimmy Grozelle, Western Ontario
  - Andrew Kwiatkowski, Western Ontario
  - Dean Labayen, York
  - David Brownrigg, Laval
