= U Sports men's basketball =

University men's basketball

- Formerly: CIAU men's basketball, CIS men's basketball
- Sport: Basketball
- Founded: 1962; 64 years ago
- No. of teams: 48, in four conferences
- Country: Canada
- Most recent champion: Carleton Ravens (2026)
- Most titles: Carleton Ravens (18)
- Related competitions: U Sports men's basketball championship
- Website: usports.ca/mbkb

U Sports men's basketball is the highest level of amateur play of basketball in Canada and operates under the auspices of U Sports, Canada's governing body for university sports. Forty-eight teams from Canadian universities are divided into four athletic conferences, drawing from the four regional associations of U Sports: Canada West Universities Athletic Association, Ontario University Athletics, Réseau du sport étudiant du Québec, and Atlantic University Sport. At the end of every season, eight teams compete for the W. P. McGee Trophy, awarded to the U Sports Men's Basketball Championship team.

== Teams ==
As of the 2022–2023 U Sports season, 48 of the 56 U Sports member institutions have men's basketball teams. The teams are split into four conferences with some conferences splitting teams further into divisions. With the addition of Ontario Tech for the 2019–20 season, the OUA moved to three six-team divisions. The Canada West conference had two divisions, but reverted to a one conference format for the 2016–17 season with 17 teams. The AUS conference has eight teams while the RSEQ conference has five.

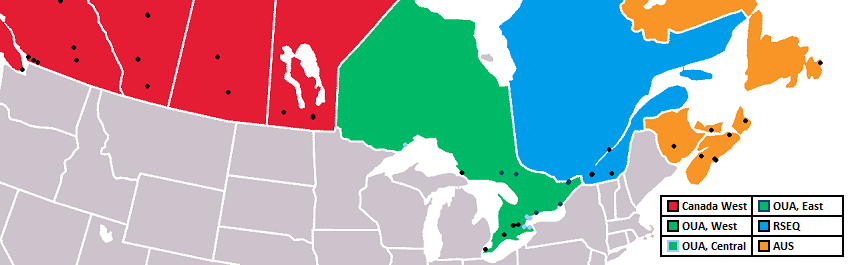

=== Atlantic University Sport ===
University	Varsity Name	City	Province	Founded	Arena	Capacity
Acadia University	Axemen	Wolfville	NS	1838	Andrew H. McCain Arena	1,800
Cape Breton University	Capers	Sydney	NS	1951	Sullivan Fieldhouse	
Dalhousie University	Tigers	Halifax	NS	1818	Dalhousie Memorial Arena	1,280
Memorial University of Newfoundland	Sea-Hawks	Saint John's	NL	1925	Memorial Fieldhouse	
Saint Mary's University	Huskies	Halifax	NS	1802	Alumni Arena	1,000
St. Francis Xavier University	X-Men	Antigonish	NS	1853	Charles V. Keating Centre	1,500
University of Prince Edward Island	Panthers	Charlottetown	PEI	1969	MacLauchlan Arena	
University of New Brunswick	Reds	Fredericton	NB	1785	Aitken University Centre	3,278

=== Canada West Universities Athletic Association ===
University	Varsity Name	City	Province	Founded	Arena	Capacity
Brandon University	Bobcats	Brandon	MB	1889	Healthy Living Centre	
MacEwan University	Griffins	Edmonton	AB	1971	Downtown Community Arena	1,000
Mount Royal University	Cougars	Calgary	AB	1931	Flames Community Arenas	500
Trinity Western University	Spartans	Langley	BC	1962	Langley Events Centre	5,300
University of Alberta	Golden Bears	Edmonton	AB	1908	Clare Drake Arena	3,000
University of British Columbia	Thunderbirds	Vancouver	BC	1906	Doug Mitchell Thunderbird Sports Centre	5,054
University of British Columbia (Okanagan Campus)	Heat	Kelowna	BC	2005	UBC Okanagan Gymnastics	
University of Calgary	Dinos	Calgary	AB	1966	Father David Bauer Olympic Arena	1,750
University of the Fraser Valley	Cascades	Abbotsford	BC	1974	Envision Athletic Centre	1,500
University of Lethbridge	Pronghorns	Lethbridge	AB	1967	1st Choice Savings Centre	
University of Manitoba	Bisons	Winnipeg	MB	1877	Max Bell Centre	2,121
University of Northern British Columbia	Timberwolves	Prince George	BC	1990	Charles Jago Northern Sport Centre	
University of Regina	Cougars	Regina	SK	1974	The Co-Operators Centre	1,300
University of Saskatchewan	Huskies	Saskatoon	SK	1907	Merlis Belsher Place	2,300
Thompson Rivers University	WolfPack	Kamloops	BC	1970	Tournament Capital Centre	2,200
University of Victoria	Vikes	Victoria	BC	1963	Centre for Athletics, Recreation and Special Abilities	
University of Winnipeg	Wesmen	Winnipeg	MB	1871	Duckworth Centre	1,780

=== Ontario University Athletics ===
==== East Division ====
University	Varsity Name	City	Province	Founded	Arena	Capacity
Carleton University	Ravens	Ottawa	ON	1952	Raven's Nest	
Laurentian University	Voyageurs	Sudbury	ON	1960	Countryside Arena	
Nipissing University	Lakers	North Bay	ON	1992	North Bay Memorial Gardens	4,246
Queen's University	Gaels	Kingston	ON	1841	Kingston Memorial Centre	3,300
Ontario Tech University	Ridgebacks	Oshawa	ON	2002	Campus Ice Centre	800
University of Ottawa	Gee-Gees	Ottawa	ON	1894	Sport Complex Arena	850

==== West Division ====
University	Varsity Name	City	Province	Founded	Arena	Capacity
Algoma University	Thunderbirds	Sault Ste. Marie	ON	1965	George Leach Centre	
University of Guelph	Gryphons	Guelph	ON	1964	Gryphon Centre Arena	1,400
University of Waterloo	Warriors	Waterloo	ON	1957	Carl Totzke Court	5,000
University of Western Ontario	Mustangs	London	ON	1878	Alumni Hall	1,200
University of Windsor	Lancers	Windsor	ON	1857	Capri Pizzeria Recreation Complex	
Wilfrid Laurier University	Golden Hawks	Waterloo	ON	1957	Waterloo Recreation Complex	3,400

==== Central Division ====
University	Varsity Name	City	Province	Founded	Arena	Capacity
Brock University	Badgers	St. Catharines	ON	1964	Seymour-Hannah Sports & Entertainment Centre	1,400
Lakehead University	Thunderwolves	Thunder Bay	ON	1947	Fort William Gardens	4,680
McMaster University	Marauders	Hamilton	ON	1887	Burridge Gymnasium in Ivor Wynne Centre	
Toronto Metropolitan University	Bold	Toronto	ON	1948	Mattamy Athletic Centre at the Gardens	2,796
University of Toronto	Varsity Blues	Toronto	ON	1827	Goldring Centre for High Performance Sport	2,000
York University	Lions	Toronto	ON	1959	Tait McKenzie Centre	1,200

=== Réseau du sport étudiant du Québec ===
University	Varsity Name	City	Province	Founded	Arena	Capacity
Bishop's University	Gaiters	Sherbrooke	QC	1843	Jane & Eric Molson Arena	800
Concordia University	Stingers	Montreal	QC	1896	Ed Meagher Arena	
McGill University	Redbirds	Montreal	QC	1821	McConnell Arena	1,600
Université Laval	Rouge et Or	Québec	QC	1663	Amphithéâtre-gymnase Desjardins	3,000
Université du Québec à Montréal	Citadins	Montreal	QC	1969	Centre Sportif de l’UQAM	
