= Ted Toogood =

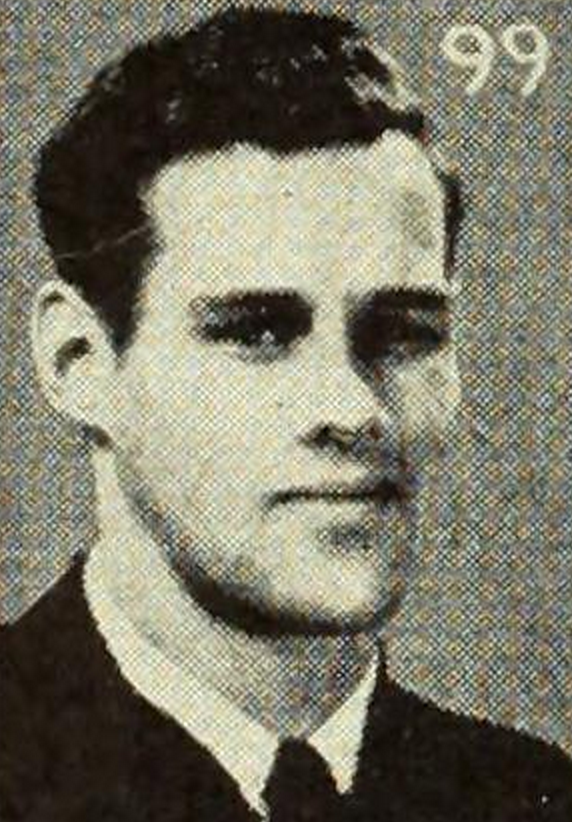
- Toogood pictured in Torontonensis 1948, University of Toronto yearbook

Profile
- Position: Halfback

Personal information
- Born: August 27, 1924; Toronto, Ontario, Canada
- Died: July 31, 2011 (aged 86); Toronto, Ontario
- Listed height: 5 ft 8 in (1.73 m)
- Listed weight: 165 lb (75 kg)

Career history
- 1950–1954: Toronto Argonauts

Awards and highlights
- 2× Grey Cup champion (1950, 1952)

Alexander Edgar (Ted) Toogood (August 27, 1924 – July 31, 2011) was a Canadian professional football player who played for the Toronto Argonauts. He won the Grey Cup with them in 1950 and 1952. He previously played football for and attended the University of Toronto, and served in World War II. He later was a teacher, attended West Virginia University (MSc 1958) and was the first athletic director at the Ryerson Institute of Technology (now Toronto Metropolitan University) from 1949 to 1961. Toogood was inducted into the University of Toronto Sports Hall of Fame in 1999, the Ryerson Athletics and Recreation Hall of Fame in 2005 and the Etobicoke Sports Hall of Fame in 2010. He died on July 31, 2011, aged 86, and donated his brain to the Krembil Neuroscience Centre Sports Concussion Project. At the time of his death, he had Alzheimer's disease, and studies of his brain revealed the presence of chronic traumatic encephalopathy, thought to be linked to previous concussions sustained in his football career.
