= Dalhousie University arena =

Arena in Halifax, Canada

Coordinates: 44°38′9.44″N 63°35′25.17″W

Dalhousie Memorial Arena
- Interactive map of the Dalhousie Memorial Arena area

General information
- Status: Demolished
- Location: 6185 South St., Halifax, Nova Scotia
- Construction started: 1981
- Opened: 1982
- Closed: 2012

Design and construction
- Architects: Daniel F. Tully and J. G. Sykes
- Main contractor: Corkum Construction

Other information
- Seating capacity: 1,280

The Oulton-Stanish Centre, opened in 2026, is a 952-seat ice hockey arena at Dalhousie University in Halifax, Nova Scotia. It was built on the site of the earlier Dalhousie Memorial Arena, demolished in 2012.

== History ==
=== Dalhousie Memorial Rink (1950–1978) ===
The Dalhousie Memorial Rink opened in 1950, and commemorated Dalhousie students who fought in the two world wars. It burned down in May 1978, suffering a structural collapse in the process.

The rink saw The Dalhousie Tigers' only AUS Championship win in 1978.

=== Dalhousie Memorial Arena (1982–2012) ===
A new facility, the Dalhousie Memorial Arena, was built on the same site. Designed by architect Daniel F. Tully, the structure was inspired by the arena at the University of Maine. It opened in 1982 and had a seated capacity of 1,280.

In 2011, Dalhousie's board of governors voted to demolish the arena, which was in need of repair. The university said that the cost of renovating the arena (estimated to be $11-12 million in 2011) was roughly the cost of building a new one.

=== Oulton-Stanish Centre (2026–present) ===
In June 2021, the Dalhousie board of governors approved a budget of $21.6 million for a new arena, called the Dalhousie Event Centre, to be built on the site of the old one, which had been used as a parking lot in the interim. In June 2022, the board was informed that costs had risen. An amended budget of $36.5 million was approved. However, construction was halted in late 2022 due to cost and labour issues. In March 2023, it was reported that there were no immediate plans to recommence work, but that the university remained "committed" to the project.

A groundbreaking ceremony was held to mark the resumption of construction on 26 September 2023. In January 2024, it was announced that the building would be named Oulton-Stanish Centre after two university alumni and project donors.

The new arena seats 900. The building also houses locker rooms, food services, and new premises for the Dalhousie Physiotherapy Clinic. It was designed by ABCP Architects and FBM Architecture and constructed by EllisDon. It was officially opened on 12 March 2026.
