= Roy Rana =

Canadian basketball coach (born 1968)

Nagoya Diamond Dolphins
- Position: Head coach
- League: B.League

Personal information
- Born: December 8, 1968 (age 57) Wolverhampton, England

Career history

Coaching
- 2009–2019: Ryerson Rams
- 2019–2022: Sacramento Kings (assistant)
- 2022–2025: Kyoto Hannaryz
- 2022–2023: Egypt
- 2025–2026: Jordan
- 2026–present: Nagoya Diamond Dolphins

Career highlights
- Canadian High School Coach of the Year (2003, 2004, 2006); High School Coach of the Year in Canada Award (2009); OUA Wilson Cup Champion (2016, 2017)
Medals
Men's basketball
Head coach for Canada
FIBA Under-19 World Cup
Gold medal – first place	2017 Egypt	U19 team
FIBA Americas U18 Championship
Silver medal – second place	2016 Chile	U18 team
Silver medal – second place	2014 United States	U18 team
Bronze medal – third place	2012 Brazil	U18 team
FIBA World U17 Cup
Bronze medal – third place	2010 Hamburg	U17 team
FIBA Americas U16 Championship
Bronze medal – third place	2009 Mendoza	U16 team

Roy Rana (born December 8, 1968) is a Canadian professional basketball coach who is the head coach for the Nagoya Diamond Dolphins of the Japanese B.League. He has previously served as head coach for the Canadian National Team during the 2019 FIBA World Cup American qualifiers, where he led Canada to a 10-2 record and a first-place finish in Group F, to secure a 2019 FIBA World Cup spot.

Rana also finished his ninth season as the head coach of the Ryerson University (now Toronto Metropolitan University) men's basketball team where he helped guide the Ryerson Rams to a 31–7 record during the 2018–19 season and a bronze medal finish in the 2019 U Sports Men's Final 8 tournament. Rana ended his tenure at Ryerson with an overall record of 195–87 after being hired as the Rams' head coach in 2010. Under Rana the Rams made six National Championship appearances in his nine seasons.

== Early years ==
The son of Indian parents from Punjab and Uttar Pradesh, Rana was born in Wolverhampton, England. His family moved to Canada when he was one year old. Rana grew up in Toronto.

== Coaching career ==
=== Eastern Commerce ===
In 2000, Rana took over the head coaching job at Eastern Commerce Collegiate Institute and became "one of the most successful high school basketball coaches in Canadian history". During his nine-year tenure at Eastern Commerce, Rana guided the Saints to five provincial high school championships and a combined 14 regional and city titles. Under his guidance, Eastern Commerce finished six of his nine seasons as the top-ranked team in Canada. He compiled a record of 256–39 with a winning percentage of 86.7 at Eastern Commerce.

He was named the 2003, 2004, 2006, and 2009 Canadian High School Coach of the Year, and the 2003 Toronto Sun High School Coach of the Year.

=== Ryerson University ===
Rana was named head coach of the Ryerson Rams men's basketball team in 2009. He took a sabbatical in 2015–16, before returning to the job for the 2016–17 season. In March 2017, Rana led the Rams to their first ever national silver medal. In the 2017–18 season, his team defeated the seven-consecutive National champion Carleton Ravens in the U Sports Final 8 semi-final, which was called the "greatest upset in U Sports basketball history". However, Rana's Rams fell short in the championship game to Calgary.

=== Nike Hoop Summit ===
Rana was named head coach of the World Select Team at the Nike Hoop Summit in 2011. He guided the World Team to Nike Hoop Summit titles in 2012 and 2013, 2015, 2018 and is now the longest serving and winningest Head Coach in World Team history. Over twenty of his World Team alumni made it to the NBA, among the alumni are Nikola Jokić, Joel Embiid, Shai Gilgeous-Alexander and RJ Barrett.

=== NBA ===
Rana was a guest coach at the NBA Summer League for the Utah Jazz in 2014 and the San Antonio Spurs in 2015. In 2019, Rana was hired as an assistant coach by the Sacramento Kings of the NBA.

=== Kyoto Hannaryz ===
From 2022 to 2025, Rana served as head coach of the Kyoto Hannaryz in Japan's B.League. In the 2024–25 season, he coached the team to 33 wins and 27 losses, Kyoto's best record since the 2016-17 campaign.

== National team career ==
Serving as assistant coach, Rana was a member of the staff of the Canadian men's national team in 2009.

Rana led Canada to a historic first ever World Championship in FIBA competition, at the 2017 U19 Basketball World Cup in Cairo Egypt. Rana has led Canada's age group teams to numerous medals in FIBA Americas competition over the past decade. He was the head coach of Canada's U16 national team in 2009 and 2010, guiding the team to bronze medals at the 2009 FIBA Americas Under-16 Championship and the 2010 FIBA Under-17 World Championship.

In 2012, Rana coached the Canadian team to a silver medal at the Nike Global Challenge and the Canada's U18 squad to a bronze medal at the FIBA Americas Under-18 Championship. Under his tutelage, Canada also won silver at the 2014 FIBA Americas Under-18 Championship. In 2015, Rana led Team Canada to a fifth-place finish at the 2015 FIBA Under-19 World Championship; at the time, it was Canada's best result in that age group. As of 2021 it's Canada's only gold medal in an international Basketball competition.

In 2016, he coached Canada's U18 national team to a silver medal at the 2016 FIBA Americas Under-18 Championship.

Rana became the first coach to guide Canada to a gold medal at a basketball World Championship, when Canada's U19 squad won the title at the 2017 FIBA U19 World Cup in Egypt.

In August 2017, he was named interim head coach of the Canadian men's basketball team for the 2017 FIBA AmeriCup and the qualifiers for the 2019 FIBA World Cup.

On June 15, 2021, he was named assistant coach for Germany men's basketball team for the FIBA Olympic qualifier, working under head coach Henrik Rödl. On July 5, Germany beat Brazil to qualify for the Olympics, Rana stayed on Germany's coaching staff to serve as assistant coach during the Olympic Games.

On January 3, 2022, Rana became the head coach of the Egyptian men's national basketball team. His contract expired in August 2023. In June 2025, he was appointed as head coach of Jordan's men's national team and as director of basketball operations.

== See also ==
- List of foreign NBA coaches
