= Saint Mary's Huskies =

Saint Mary's University athletic teams

- University: Saint Mary's University
- Nickname: Huskies
- Association: U Sports
- Conference: Atlantic University Sport
- Athletic director: Scott Gray
- Location: Halifax, Nova Scotia
- Varsity teams: 13 (6 men's, 7 women's)
- Football stadium: Huskies Stadium
- Arena: The Dauphinee Centre
- Other Facilities: The Tower
- Other venues: Halifax Forum
- Colours: Maroon and White
- Mascot: The Husky
- Website: www.smuhuskies.ca
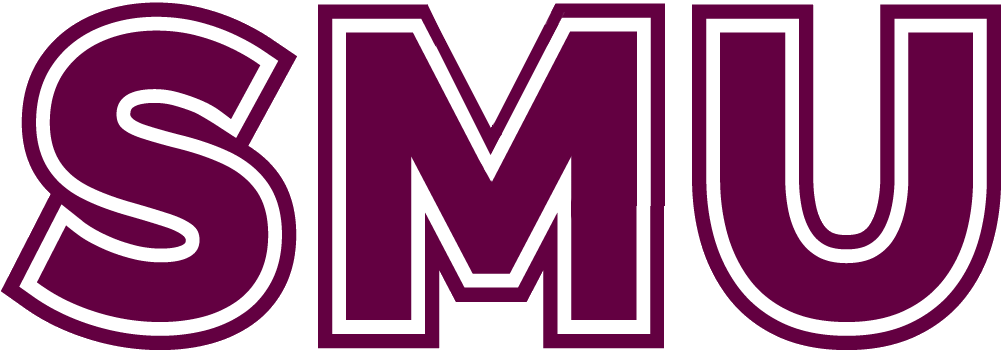

The Saint Mary's Huskies are the men's and women's athletic teams that represent Saint Mary's University in Halifax, Nova Scotia, Canada. Their primary home stadium is Huskies Stadium, located in the university's campus.

In September 2007, Saint Mary's announced plans to build the new Homburg Centre for Health & Wellness, that will comprise the current gymnasium (The Tower), the new Dauphinee Arena, and a new building to connect the two. The centre is to be named after Richard Homburg, who provided a $5 million gift to the project, the largest gift the university has received in its 205-year history. The Dauphinee Arena, completed in 2019, has an NHL-sized ice surface and a seating capacity of 875. The arena is named for Bob Dauphinee, who left an estate gift to the university of $2.1 million.

== Varsity teams ==
Men's sports	Women's sports
Basketball	Basketball
Cross country	Cross country
Football	Ice hockey
Ice hockey	Rugby
Soccer	Soccer
Track and field	Track and field
	Volleyball

=== Men's Basketball ===
The Huskies have the second-most Atlantic Conference Championships (14), their last being the 2013–14 season. Of the AUS conference teams, the Huskies have the most U Sports Championships, winning the W. P. McGee Trophy four times: in 1973, 1978, 1979, and most recently in 1999.

Saint Mary's University was the host venue for the championship tournament four times: in 1965, 1976, 1977, and 1978. The tournament was hosted in Halifax again for 24 consecutive years, first at Dalhousie University from 1984 to 1987 and then at the Halifax Metro Centre from 1988–2007. The tournament returned to the Metro Centre for the 2011 and 2012 championships.

=== Women's Basketball ===
The women's has the third most AUS championships ever (8), their last being the 2024–25 season. The women have competed in the U Sports Women's Basketball Championships eight times, winning a CIS Silver Medal in 2014, and Bronze Medals in 2016 and 2013.

=== Football ===
The Huskies football team reached the Vanier Cup eight times between 1988 and 2007, winning in 2001 and 2002. They were the third university to win back-to-back championships, and the first of three universities to appear in at least three consecutive championship tournaments (2001–2003).

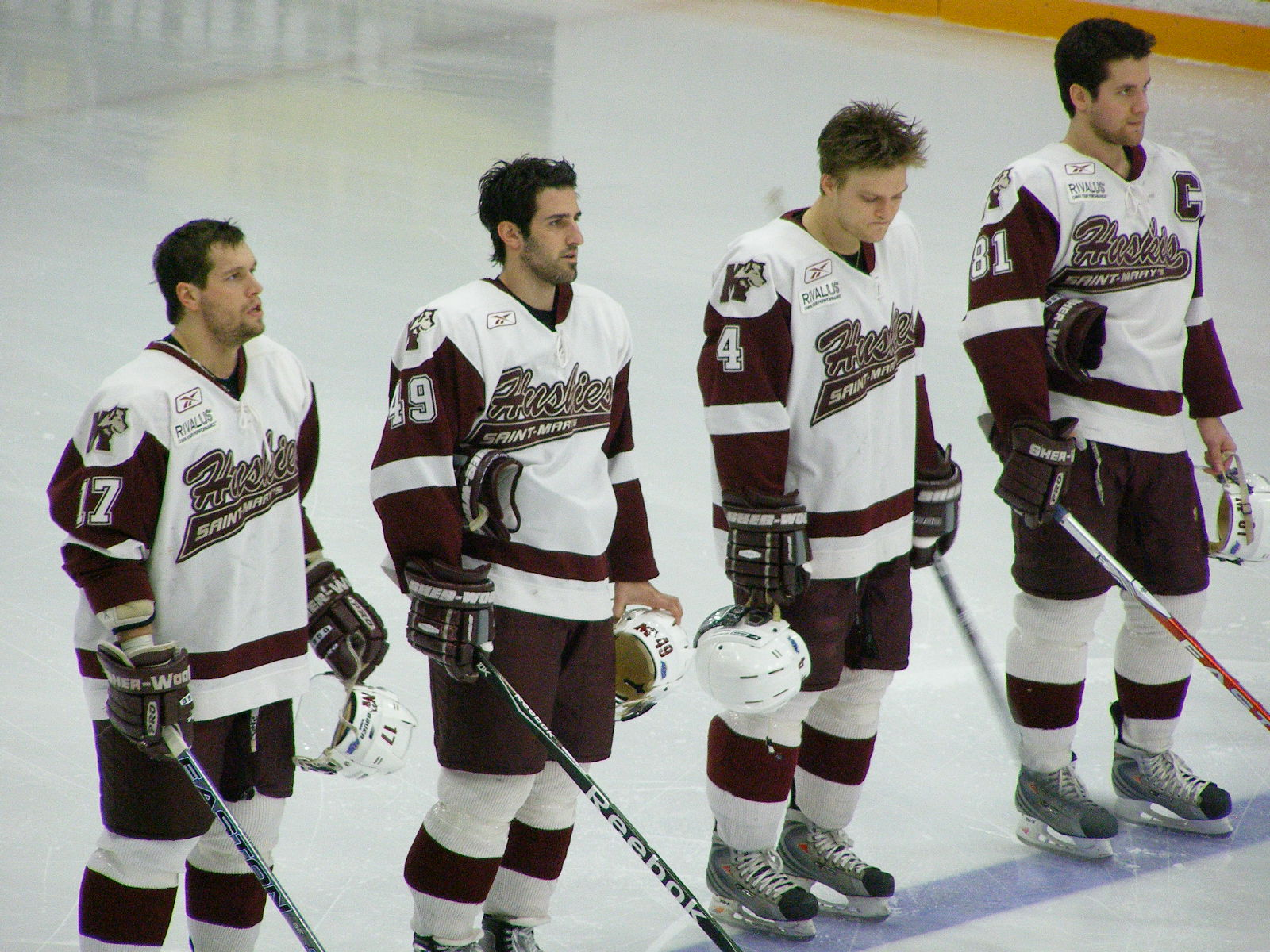
Saint Mary's Huskies hockey players lined up

=== Men's Hockey ===
The Huskies have the third-most Atlantic Conference Championships (13), their last being the 2009–10 season. In 2010, the Huskies won their first U Sports University Cup by defeating the Alberta Golden Bears 3–2 in overtime. This was the Huskies' fifth appearance in the championship final and their first since 1973.

=== Women's Hockey ===
The women's team has won the second-most Atlantic Conference Championships (7), and they are the current champions (2017–18 season). The Huskies have yet to compete in the U Sports Women's Ice Hockey Championship final.

=== Women's Rugby ===
Since rugby became a fully sanctioned Atlantic University Sport in 2002, the Huskies have finished runner up four times (2002, 2007, 2008 and 2009) to the St. Francis Xavier X-Women.

=== Men's Soccer ===
The men's team is tied with the Dalhousie Tigers for the second-most Atlantic Conference Championships (13), with their most recent in the 2011 season. The men reached the U Sports Men's Soccer Championship five times (1979, 1989, 2000, 2003, and 2011) but have yet to win the championship.

=== Women's Soccer ===
The women's team are tied with the St. Francis Xavier X-Women for the fourth-most Atlantic Conference Championships (2), their last title being in 2002.

=== Women's Volleyball ===
The Huskies women's volleyball program is tied with the Moncton Aigles Bleues for the third-most Atlantic Conference Championships (6), with their last being for the 2011–12 season.
