= Acadia Axemen and Axewomen =

Athletic teams of Acadia University

Acadia Axemen / Acadia Axewomen
- University: Acadia University
- Association: U Sports
- Conference: Atlantic University Sport
- Athletic director: Brian Finniss
- Location: Wolfville, Nova Scotia
- Varsity teams: 11 (5 men's, 6 women's)
- Football stadium: Raymond Field
- Ice hockey arena: Andrew H. McCain Arena
- Soccer stadium: Raymond Field
- Rugby venue: Raymond Field
- Colours: Red and Blue
- Fight song: "Stand Up and Cheer!"
- Website: www.acadiaathletics.ca

The Acadia Axemen and Axewomen are the men's and women's athletic teams that represent Acadia University in Wolfville, Nova Scotia, Canada. The on-campus sports facilities used by Axemen teams include Raymond Field for various field sports and Andrew H. McCain Arena for ice hockey.

In September 2006, Acadia University announced its partnership with the Wolfville Tritons Swim Club and the Acadia Masters Swim Club to form the Acadia Swim Club and return competitive swimming to the university after a 14-year hiatus. On 26 September 2008, the university announced its intention to return swimming to a varsity status in September 2009.

== Varsity teams ==
Acadia Axemen/Axewomen teams compete in:

| Men's sports | Women's sports |
|---|---|
| Basketball | Basketball |
| Football | Cross country |
| Ice hockey | Rugby |
| Soccer | Soccer |
| | Volleyball |

=== Football ===
The Acadia Axemen football team has been in operation since 1957 and has won 15 conference championships and two national championships.

=== Ice hockey ===
The Acadia Axemen ice hockey team has played in the final of the David Johnston University Cup four times, winning the championship in 1993 and 1996:

| Year | Location | Rival | Res. | Score |
|---|---|---|---|---|
| 1992 | Toronto, ON | Alberta Golden Bears | L | 2–5 |
| 1993 | Toronto, ON | Toronto Varsity Blues | W | 12–1 |
| 1996 | Toronto, ON | Waterloo Warriors | W | 3–2 |
| 1998 | Saskatoon, SK | UNB Varsity Reds | L | 3–6 |

In addition, two Axemen have been honoured with the Major W.J. ‘Danny’ McLeod award as the University Cup's Most Valuable Player: forward George Dupont in 1993 and forward Greg Clancy in 1996.
