= Dalhousie Tigers =

Athletic teams of Dalhousie University in Halifax

- University: Dalhousie University
- Nickname: Tigers
- Association: U Sports
- Conference: Atlantic University Sport; RSEQ
- Athletic director: Tim Maloney
- Location: Halifax, Nova Scotia
- Varsity teams: 16 (8 men's, 8 women's)
- Basketball arena: Dalplex fieldhouse
- Ice hockey arena: Halifax Forum
- Soccer stadium: Wickwire Field
- Volleyball arena: Sexton Gym
- Colours: Black, Gold, and Black
- Website: daltigers.ca/landing/index

The Dalhousie Tigers are the men's and women's athletic teams that represent Dalhousie University in Halifax, Nova Scotia, Canada. The Tigers field 14 varsity teams with seven men's teams and seven women's teams that primarily compete in the Atlantic University Sport conference of U Sports. The university also offers numerous intramural and club sports that are available to students, staff, alumni, and Dalpex members.

== Varsity teams ==
While technically not considered a varsity team, Dalhousie has a university ringette team which competes annually in the Canadian national University Challenge Cup.

Men's sports	Women's sports
Basketball	Basketball
Cross country	Cross country
Ice hockey	Ice hockey
Soccer	Soccer
Swimming	Swimming
Track & field	Track & field
Volleyball	Volleyball

=== Men's basketball ===
The Tigers men's basketball program has won nine AUS conference championships, including seven within nine years (from the 2014–15 season to 2021–22). In the National Tournament, the Tigers won a bronze medal in 2017 and a silver medal in 2020. The team plays their home games at the Dalplex fieldhouse.

=== Women's basketball ===
The Tigers women's basketball team has finished as conference champions 11 times, with the most recent coming in the 2000–01 season. Historically, the team has won a silver medal in the U Sports women's basketball championship in 1980 and a bronze medal in 1982. The team plays their home games at the Dalplex fieldhouse.

=== Men's hockey ===
The Tigers men's hockey team has won one conference championship, with the title being awarded following the 1978–79 season.

=== Women's hockey ===
The Tigers women's ice hockey program began in 2002 and qualified for the U Sports Women's Ice Hockey Tournament in 2006.

=== Men's soccer ===
The Tigers men's soccer team are tied with the Saint Mary's Huskies for the second-most AUS conference championships (13), with their most recent in the 2008 season. The program boasts a national championship win in the 1995 edition of the U Sports Men's Soccer Championship. The team was also a bronze medal winner in the 1992 and 1997 tournaments.

=== Women's soccer ===
The Tigers women's soccer team has won the most AUS conference championships in U Sports women's soccer with 12 titles earned, the most recent coming in 2012. The program has won the most national championships among all Dalhousie varsity sports with three Gladys Bean Memorial Trophy wins. The gold medals were won in 1994, 1999, and 2000 while the team won silver medals in 1993 and 1995 and a bronze medal in 1998.

=== Men's volleyball ===
The Tiger's men's volleyball program features 36 AUS conference championship winners within 44 years (first in the 1971–72 season and last in the 2014–15 season). However, after the disbanding of the Moncton Aigles Bleus team in 2006, the AUS featured only three teams, so interlock play with the RSEQ was featured heavily. The conference was further reduced to two following the folding of the Memorial Sea-Hawks after the 2016–17 season, leaving the program in jeopardy since the AUS requires a three-team minimum for varsity leagues. However, the AUS allowed Dalhousie and the UNB Varsity Reds to play a transitional season before joining the RSEQ as full members for the 2018–19 season.

On the national stage, in the U Sports men's volleyball championship, the men's volleyball team has finished with a silver medal in 1997 and with bronze medals in 1994 and 1995.

=== Women's volleyball ===
The Tiger's women's volleyball team has won the most conference championships in the AUS with 27 titles won, including ten in a row from 2013 to 2023. The program features a U Sports women's volleyball championship team, having won a gold medal in 1982. The team also won a silver medal in 1984.

== Club teams ==
The Dalhousie Tigers offer students the opportunity to play club sports for their university in lieu of these sports not being supported at the varsity level. Some sports were formerly offered as varsity sports, but either retained or resurrected as informal club sports.

Men's sports	Women's sports
Badminton	Badminton
Baseball	Black & Gold Dance Team
Curling	Cheerleading
Rugby	Rugby
Canadian Football	Curling
Sailing	Sailing
Ultimate Frisbee	Ultimate Frisbee
	Field Hockey
	Ringette

Dalhousie Tigers

General information
- Founded: 1947
- Folded: 1976
- Stadium: Wickwire Field
- Headquartered: Halifax, Nova Scotia
- Website: https://dalfootball.ca/

Personnel
- Owner: Dalhousie University
- Head coach: Freddy Diab

Team history
- HCCFL (1947–1950); NSCFL (1951–1950); MIFL (1958–1959); AFC (1960–1965); MIAA (1966–1968); AIAA (1969–1973); AUAA (1974–1975); AFL (2010–present)

League / conference affiliations
- Atlantic Football League

Championships
- AFL Championships: 6; 2016, 2018, 2021, 2022, 2024, 2025

=== Football ===
The Tigers football team first began play as an intermediate team in 1947 in the Halifax City Canadian Football League. The program was in operation until 1976 when the school decided to cease its operations and funding. The team did not win a Jewett Trophy conference championship while playing in what is now the AUS.

In 2010, with the support of Dalhousie alumni, volunteer coaches, and the Student Football Club Executive, the Tigers football team was revived as a club sport and began play in the upstart Atlantic Football League, along with the University of New Brunswick Saint John, University of New Brunswick Fredericton, and Holland College. The Tigers played in the Moosehead Cup in their inaugural year, but lost to the UNBSJ Seawolves by a score of 40–6 on November 20, 2010. The team had mixed success until they went undefeated in 2016 and captured their first Moosehead Cup on November 5, 2016, in a 29–11 victory over the three-time defending champion Holland Hurricanes. The Tigers won a second Moosehead Cup championship in 2018 with another undefeated season being capped by a win over the Hurricanes. The team won their third championship in 2021 following a 40–14 victory over the UNBF Red Bombers. The team won their fourth championship in 2022, following a 27–26 victory over the UNBF Red Bombers.

== Facilities ==
Dalhousie has a number of athletic facilities open to varsity teams and students. Dalplex is the largest main fitness and recreational facility. It houses a large fieldhouse, an Olympic-sized swimming pool, an indoor running track, weight rooms, courts and other facilities. Wickwire Field, with a seating capacity of up to 1,200, is the university's main outdoor field and is host to the varsity football, soccer, field hockey, lacrosse and rugby teams. Other sporting facilities include the Studley Gymnasium, and the Sexton Gymnasium and field. The Memorial Arena, home to the varsity hockey team, was demolished in 2012. The school is working to build a new arena jointly with nearby Saint Mary's University, whose facility is also aging.

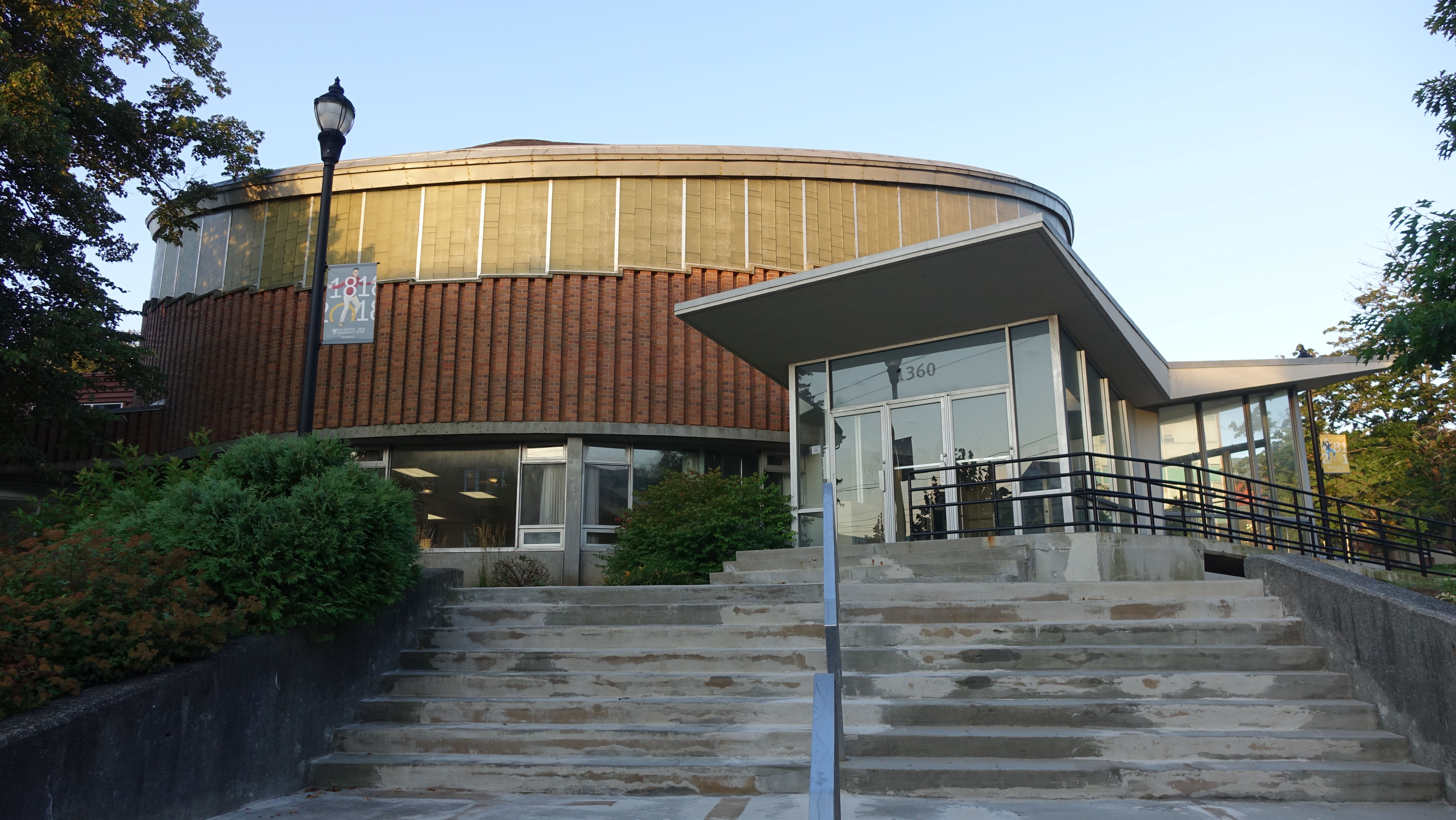
Sexton Gymnasium is one of five athletic facilities operated by the university

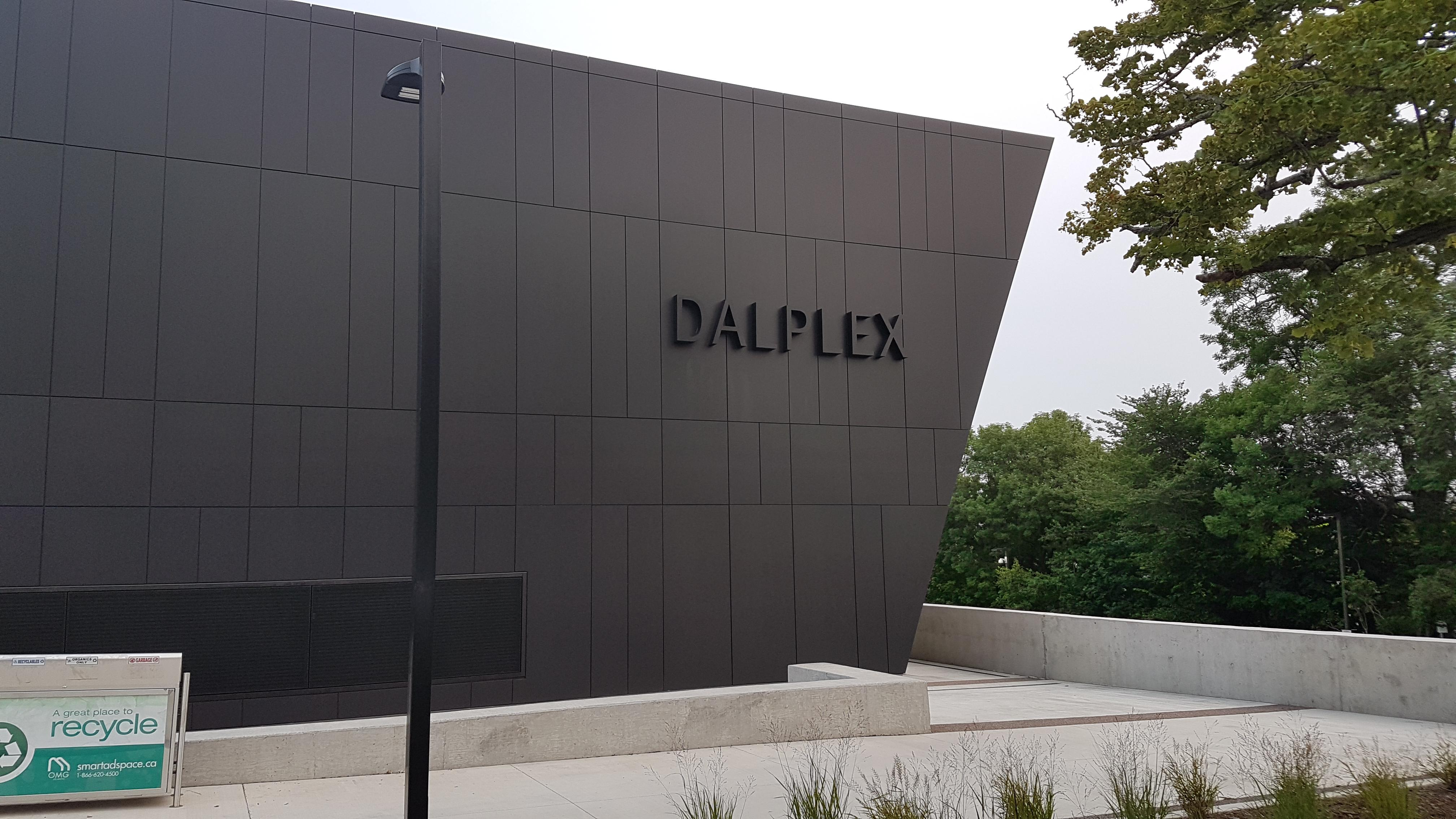
Dalplex is the largest fitness and recreational centre operated by Dalhousie

== Awards and honours ==
=== Athletes of the Year ===
Year	Female athlete	Sport	Male athlete	Sport	Ref.
1999–00	Stef Finateri	Soccer	Chris Stewart	Swimming	
2000–01	Julie Piggozzo	Soccer	Chris Wolfenden	Volleyball	
2001–02	Angelia Crealock; Claire Martin	Basketball; Soccer	Marty Johnson	Hockey	
2002–03	Adrienne Power	Track & Field	Chris Stanley	Hockey	
2003–04	Adrienne Power	Track & Field	Chris Stanley	Hockey	
2004–05	Adrienne Power	Track & Field	Jeff Weiler	Volleyball	
2005–06	Kiera Aitken; Janice Ashworth	Swimming; Cross Country	Jeff Weiler	Volleyball	
2006–07	Leanne Huck	Soccer	Jeff Weiler	Volleyball	
2007–08	Leanne Huck	Soccer	Nik Rademacher	Volleyball	
2008–09	Jeanette Huck	Soccer	Bryce Tung	Swimming	
2009–10	Celia Peters	Track & Field	David Sharpe	Swimming	
2010–11	Jeanette Huck	Soccer	Simon Farine	Basketball	
2011–12	Rieka Santilli	Soccer	Simon Watts	Track & Field	
2012–13	Rieka Santilli	Soccer	David Sharpe	Swimming	
2013–14	Rebecca Haworth	Track & Field	David Sharpe	Swimming	
2014–15	Meagan Bernier	Swimming	Bryan Duquette	Volleyball	
2015–16	Phoebe Lenderyou	Swimming	Ritchie Kanza Mata	Basketball	
2016–17	Phoebe Lenderyou	Swimming	Kashrell Lawrence	Basketball	
2017–18	Courtney Baker	Volleyball	Matthew Coolen	Track & Field	
2018–19	Courtney Baker	Volleyball	Matthew Coolen	Track & Field	
2019–20	Courtney Baker	Volleyball	Keevan Veinot	Basketball	
2020–21	Season Cancelled due to COVID-19 pandemic		Season Cancelled due to COVID-19 pandemic		
2021–22	Reagan Crowell; Lorene Heubach	Volleyball; Track & Field	Alex Carson	Basketball	
2022–23	Lucy Glen-Carter	Volleyball	Aidan Goslett	Track & Field/Cross Country	
2023–24	Lucy Glen-Carter	Volleyball	Zach James; Malcolm Christie	Track & Field/Cross Country; Basketball	
2024–25	Chelsea MacIsaac; Grace Beer	Track & Field; Hockey	James Benoit	Track & Field/Cross Country	
