= Carleton Ravens men's basketball =

Men's university basketball team

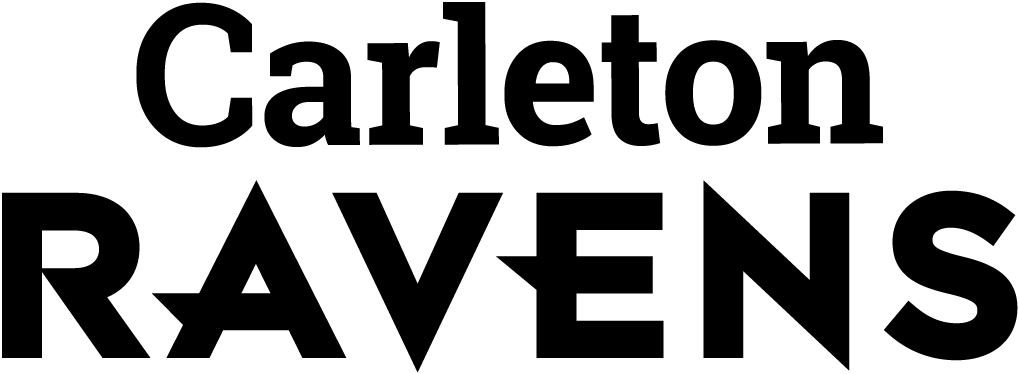
- University: Carleton University
- Head coach: Taffe Charles (7th season)
- Location: Ottawa, Ontario
- Arena: Ravens’ Nest
- Conference: OUA; East Division
- Nickname: Ravens
- Colors: Black, white, and red

U Sports tournament champions
- 2003, 2004, 2005, 2006, 2007, 2009, 2011, 2012, 2013, 2014, 2015, 2016, 2017, 2019, 2020, 2022, 2023, 2026

Conference tournament champions
- 2003, 2004 2005, 2008, 2009, 2010, 2012, 2013, 2015, 2018, 2019, 2020

Uniforms
Home	Away

The Carleton Ravens men's basketball team represents Carleton University in the Ontario University Athletics conference of U Sports men's basketball. The Ravens have captured 18 W. P. McGee Trophy national championship wins, more than any top division school in Canada or the United States, and are the reigning national champions (2026). In addition, the Ravens have earned the Wilson Cup, awarded to the OUA champions, 12 times: 2003 to 2005, 2008 to 2010, 2012 to 2013, 2015, and 2018 to 2020.

On the same day in 2023 (March 12), both the men’s and women’s teams won the national title, something no school had accomplished since 1985, when the Victoria Vikes were double champions. The twin feat was also accomplished in the same province—Nova Scotia—though in different cities, as the men played in Halifax, the women, in Sydney. The men’s game on that day went to double overtime, a first for the title game. It set a record for number of points by any team in the finals (109), in a match that also saw the highest number of combined points scored (213).

The Ravens took part in 20 consecutive national championship tournaments from 2003 to 2023, but did not qualify for the 2024 tournament, and so were unable to defend their title.

Outside of its typical season games, the men's basketball team plays exhibition games with NCAA teams from the United States during the summer months, billed as the Can-Am Shootout. During these games, Carleton has garnered significant wins over reputable Division I teams such as the University of Mississippi, University of Cincinnati, University of Wisconsin-Madison and South Dakota State University.

== History ==
Below is the program's regular season record since the 1996–97 season.

=== Season-by-season Record ===
National Champion	Lost championship	Conference Champion	League leader

Season	W	L	PF	PA	Finish
1996–97	5	15	1360	1678	7th, OUA East
1997–98	7	13	1391	1542	6th, OUA East
1998–99	12	8	1392	1351	2nd, OUA East
1999–00	11	9	1321	1357	3rd, OUA East
2000–01	21	1	1777	1390	1st, OUA East
2001–02	19	3	1826	1443	1st, OUA East
2002–03	21	1	1842	1400	1st, OUA East
2003–04	22	0	1635	1270	1st, OUA East
2004–05	22	0	1615	1268	1st, OUA East
2005–06	20	2	1695	1266	1st, OUA East
2006–07	19	3	1693	1282	1st, OUA East
2007–08	22	0	1869	1318	1st, OUA East
2008–09	21	1	1960	1393	1st, OUA East
2009–10	20	2	1901	1389	1st, OUA East
2010–11	22	0	2016	1341	1st, OUA East
2011–12	22	0	2087	1245	1st, OUA East
2012–13	19	1	1819	1232	1st, OUA East
2013–14	22	0	2073	1368	1st, OUA East
2014–15	17	2	1730	1072	2nd, OUA North
2015–16	16	3	1641	1153	2nd, OUA North
2016–17	19	0	1748	1114	1st, OUA North
2017–18	23	0	2036	1389	1st, OUA East
2018–19	22	1	2101	1364	1st, OUA East
2019–20	21	1	2151	1398	1st, OUA East
2020–21					Cancelled due to Covid-19
2021–22	14	0	1641	1206	1st, OUA East
2022–23	20	4			2nd, OUA East
2023–24	13	9	1733	1637	4th, OUA East
2024–25	15	7	1751	1460	3rd, OUA East
2025–26	17	5	1725	1398	1st, OUA East

=== Capital Hoops Classic ===
Ottawa victories	Carleton victories

Year	Site	Winning team		Losing team		Series	Attendance	Notes
2007	Scotiabank Place	Ottawa	64	Carleton	62	OTT 1–0	9,730	Inaugural edition of the Capital Hoops Classic
2008	Scotiabank Place	Carleton	70	Ottawa	66	TIED 1–1	9,124	
2009	Scotiabank Place	Carleton	87	Ottawa	72	CAR 2–1	10,523	
2010	Scotiabank Place	Carleton	77	Ottawa	66	CAR 3–1	8,074	
2011	Scotiabank Place	Carleton	78	Ottawa	65	CAR 4–1	7,565	
2012	Scotiabank Place	Carleton	74	Ottawa	34	CAR 5–1	7,022	Largest margin of victory
2013	Scotiabank Place	Carleton	63	Ottawa	58	CAR 6–1	6,208	
2014	Canadian Tire Centre	Carleton	82	Ottawa	58	CAR 7–1	6,604	
2015	Canadian Tire Centre	Carleton	79	Ottawa	66	CAR 8–1	10,780	Highest attendance record
2016	Canadian Tire Centre	Ottawa	78	Carleton	72	CAR 8–2	10,105	
2017	Canadian Tire Centre	Carleton	74	Ottawa	61	CAR 9–2	10,030	
2018	Canadian Tire Centre	Carleton	67	Ottawa	56	CAR 10–2	8,579	
2019	Canadian Tire Centre	Carleton	82	Ottawa	64	CAR 11–2	9,004	
2020	TD Place	Ottawa	68	Carleton	67	CAR 11–3	8,103	
2021	Not played due to COVID-19							
2022	Ravens Nest	Carleton	71	Ottawa	58	CAR 12–3		Attendance restricted due to COVID-19
2023	TD Place	Carleton	67	Ottawa	61	CAR 13–3	7,029	
2024	TD Place	Ottawa	71	Carleton	61	CAR 13–4	6,137	

== U Sports Final 8 results ==
Year	Seed	Round	Opponent	Result
2019	#1	First Round; Semi-Finals; Finals	#8 Alberta Golden Bears #5 Dalhousie Tigers #2 Calgary Dinos	W 100–60; W 76–65; W 83–49
2020	#1	First Round; Semi-Finals; Finals	#8 Calgary Dinos #5 Western Mustangs #2 Dalhousie Tigers	W 82–66; W 90–63; W 74–65
2022	#7	First Round; Semi-Finals; Finals	#2 Victoria Vikes #3 Alberta Golden Bears #8 Saskatchewan Huskies	W 94–77; W 64–63; W 85–72
2023	#3	First Round; Semi-Finals; Finals	#6 UQAM Citadins #2 Ottawa Gee-Gees #4 St. Francis Xavier X-Men	W 73–71; W 81–75; W 109–104

== Individual Leader Scoring ==
Legend
GP	Games played	GS	Games started	MIN	Minutes played
FG	Field-goals	3FG	3-point field-goals	FT	Free-throws
PTS	Points	AVG	Points per game

Season	Player	GP	Min	FG	3FG	FT	Pts	Avg	OUA rank
2019–20	Lloyd Pandi	19	441	126	4	47	303	15.9	21st
2018–19	Eddie Ekiyor	23	530	125	0	70	320	13.9	24th
2017–18	Yasiin Joseph	24	582	130	49	50	359	15.0	15th
2016–17	Connor Wood	19	512	128	76	32	364	19.2	4th
2015–16	Guillaume Boucard	13	305	77	8	36	198	15.2	16th
2014–15	Thomas Scrubb	19	504	137	20	32	326	17.2	9th
2013–14	Philip Scrubb	21	580	123	53	95	394	18.8	7th
2012–13	Philip Scrubb	14	419	83	39	68	273	19.5	4th
2011–12	Philip Scrubb	15	351	85	44	38	252	16.8	6th
2010–11	Tyson Hinz	22	579	131	16	97	375	17.0	7th
2009–10	Kevin McCleery	20	488	135	1	51	322	16.1	10th

== Awards and honours ==
=== U Sports Awards ===
==== Jack Donohue Trophy ====
MVP of the National Championship Tournament

- 2023 Aiden Warnholtz
- 2022 Alain Louis
- 2020 Isiah Osborne
- 2019 Eddie Ekiyor
- 2017 Kaza Kajami-Keane
- 2016 Connor Wood
- 2015 Philip Scrubb
- 2014 Tyson Hinz
- 2013 Thomas Scrubb
- 2012 Philip Scrubb
- 2011 Tyson Hinz
- 2009 Stuart Turnbull
- 2007 Aaron Doornekamp
- 2006 Osvaldo Jeanty
- 2005 Mike Smart
- 2004 Mike Smart
- 2003 Osvaldo Jeanty

==== Mike Moser Memorial Trophy ====
Outstanding Male Basketball Player

- 2021-22 Lloyd Pandi
- 2016-17 Connor Wood
- 2013-14 Philip Scrubb
- 2012-13 Philip Scrubb
- 2011-12 Philip Scrubb
- 2010-11 Tyson Hinz
- 2007-08 Aaron Doornekamp
- 2006-07 Osvaldo Jeanty
- 2005-06 Osvaldo Jeanty

==== Dr. Peter Mullins Trophy ====
Rookie of the Year

- 2023-24 Xavier Spencer
- 2019-20 Lloyd Pandi
- 2010-11 Philip Scrubb

==== First Team All-Canadians ====
- 2023 Aiden Warnholtz
- 2022 Lloyd Pandi
- 2019 Eddie Ekiyor
- 2017 Connor Wood
- 2015 Philip Scrubb
  - Thomas Scrubb
- 2014 Philip Scrubb
- 2013 Tyson Hinz
  - Philip Scrubb
- 2012 Tyson Hinz
  - Philip Scrubb

- 2011 Tyson Hinz
- 2009 Stuart Turnbull
- 2008 Aaron Doornekamp
- 2007 Osvaldo Jeanty
- 2006 Osvaldo Jeanty
- 2005 Michael Smart
- 2003 Rob Smart Jr.
- 2002 Jafeth Maseruka
- 1969 Denis Schuthe

==== All-Rookie Team ====
- 2024 Xavier Spencer
  - Augustus Bradzeikis

=== University Awards ===
- Tyson Hinz, 2010-11 Carleton Ravens Male Athlete of the Year
- Philip Scrubb, 2014-15 Carleton Ravens Male Athlete of the Year
- Kaza Kajami-Keane, 2016-17 Carleton Ravens Male Athlete of the Year
- Eddie Ekiyor, 2018-19 Carleton Ravens Male Athlete of the Year

== Ravens in pro basketball ==
=== Players ===
Player	Position	Team(s)	League(s)	Years	Titles
Marcus Anderson	Guard	Guelph Nighthawks (2020, 2021)	CEBL		
Ryan Bell	Guard	FC Schalke 04 Basketball (2008-09); Espoon Honka (2009-10)	ProA; Korisliiga	2	
Guillaume Boucard	Power forward / small forward	Niagara River Lions (2017-2018, 2019-2021)	NBL Canada, CEBL		
Aaron Doornekamp	Power forward / small forward	Pepsi Caserta (2009–12); Braunschweig (2013–14); Skyliners Frankfurt (2014–16); Canarias (2016–17); Valencia Basket (2017–20); Canarias (2020-present)	Liga ACB Liga ACB		FIBA Europe Cup champion (2016); FIBA Champions League champion (2017); EuroCup champion (2019); FIBA Champions League champion (2022)
Ryan Ejim	Power forward	Niagara River Lions (2016-2018); Hamilton Honey Badgers, Saskatchewan Rattlers (2019); Niagara River Lions (2020); Fraser Valley Bandits (2021)	NBL Canada; CEBL; CEBL; CEBL		CEBL Champion (2019)
Tyson Hinz	Power forward	Landstede Basketbal; Mitteldeutscher BC	DBL	3	German ProA champion (2017)
Osvaldo Jeanty	Shooting guard Point guard	Giants Nördlingen (2007–2009); CS Gaz Metan Media (2009-2010); Gießen 46ers (2010); Medi Bayreuth (2010–2012); London Lightning (2012); Mitteldeutscher BC (2013)			
Yasiin Joseph	Point guard	Ottawa Blackjacks (2020); Landstede Hammers (2021); Ferro-ZNTU Zaporozhye (2021)	CEBL; DBL; Ukrainian Basketball SuperLeague		
Kaza Kajami-Keane	Point guard	Raptors 905; Landstede Hammers; Mitteldeutscher BC; Le Mans Sarthe Basket	NBA G League; DBL; BBL; LNB Pro A	4 years (current)	DBL Champion (2019)
TJ Lall	Power forward	Ottawa Blackjacks (2020); Guelph Nighthawks (2021)	CEBL		
Alain Louis	Point guard	Ottawa Blackjacks (2021)	CEBL		
Isiah Osborne	Point guard Shooting guard	Ottawa Blackjacks (2020); Kouvot (2021)	CEBL; Korisliiga		
Lloyd Pandi	Power forward Point guard Shooting guard	Ottawa Blackjacks (2020); Niagara River Lions (2021)	CEBL		
Joe Rocca	Guard	Niagara River Lions Ham. Honey Badgers Spišská Nová Ves BC Mgzavrebi	NBL Canada; CEBL SBL Georgian Superliga		
Philip Scrubb	Point guard Shooting guard	AEK Athens; Skyliners Frankfurt; Zenit Saint Petersburg; Estudiantes; Limoges CSP			FIBA Europe Cup champion (2016)
Thomas Scrubb	Small forward	Kataja (2015–16); Gießen 46ers (2016–17); Scandone Avellino (2017–18); Varese (2018–19); SIG Strasbourg (2019–20); Ottawa Blackjacks (2020); JL Bourg (2020–present)	CEBL; LNB Pro A		
Grant Shephard	Power forward	Fraser Valley Bandits (2020); Niagara River Lions (2021)	CEBL		
Stuart Turnbull	Guard	Giants Nördlingen (2009); SC Rist Wedel (2009–10); UBC Hannover Tigers (2010–11); Dragons Rhöndorf (2011–12)	German ProA; ProB		
Munis Tutu	Point guard	Ottawa Blackjacks (2020); Ehingen Urspring (2021)	CEBL; BBL Pro A		
Connor Wood	Shooting guard	Niagara River Lions (2017-2018); Paderborn Baskets (2018-19); UJAP Quimper (2019); Guelph Nighthawks (2019); Rio Ourense (2019–2020)	CEBL; ProA; LNB Pro B CEBL; LEB Oro		

=== Head coaches ===
Name	Team(s)	League(s)	Titles
Victor Raso	Niagara River Lions (2017–2021)	NBL Canada, CEBL	
Osvaldo Jeanty	Ottawa Blackjacks (2020)	CEBL	
