= 2007–08 Carleton Ravens men's basketball season =

The 2007–08 Carleton University Ravens men's basketball season began on August 31, 2007, with exhibition games against NCAA Division I teams, and with regular season games beginning on November 9. The season ended when the Ravens hosted the national championships at Scotiabank Place for the first time. Despite a stellar 22–0 regular season and 31–0 record against Canadian competition, the Ravens lost in the CIS semi-final to the Acadia Axemen, ending their 5 straight championships.

== Roster ==
#	Name	Pos.
3	Mike Kenny	Guard
10	Elliot Thompson	Guard
11	Ryan Bell	Guard
13	Stuart Turnbull	Guard
15	Jean-Émmanuel Jean-Marie	Forward
21	Derek McConnery	Forward
22	Cole Hobin	Guard
23	Daron Leonard	Forward
31	Luke Chapman	Guard
33	Rob Saunders	Guard
41	Neal Dawson	Forward
42	Aaron Doornekamp	Forward
43	Aaron Chapman	Forward
45	Kevin McCleery	Forward

Coach: Dave Smart

== Pre-season ==
Exhibition games against NCAA Division I Teams

Carleton performed well against some top teams from the NCAA at home in late August and early September. They lost to an Illinois team featuring Michael Jordan's son, Jeffrey Jordan in overtime. After going down to defeat against Villanova, the Ravens rebounded with a victory over the University of Alabama. They went to 3 U.S. Universities in late October and early November and were soundly defeated in all three.

Date	Opponent	Score
August 31	Illinois Fighting Illini	72–74 (OT)
September 1	Villanova Wildcats	46–61
September 2	Alabama Crimson Tide	83–72

House-Laughton Tournament

Date	Opponent	Score
October 12	UQAM Citadins	98–71
October 13	Guelph Gryphons	72–69
October 14	Dalhousie Tigers	96–69

Exhibition games on the road

Date	Opponent	Score	Location
October 19	Brandon Bobcats	64–63	University of Victoria
October 20	Alberta Golden Bears	61–56	University of Victoria
October 21	Victoria Vikes	72–55	University of Victoria
October 29	Louisville Cardinals	49–82	University of Louisville
November 2	Providence Friars	72–86	Rhode Island University
November 4	Boston College Eagles	47–72	Boston College

== Regular season ==
#	Date	Visitor	Score	Home	Record
1	November 9	Carleton Ravens	76–51	McMaster Marauders	1–0
2	November 10	Carleton Ravens	85–52	Lakehead Thunderwolves	2–0
3	November 16	Waterloo Warriors	53–77	Carleton Ravens	3–0
4	November 17	Laurier Golden Hawks	66–90	Carleton Ravens	4–0
5	November 23	Western Mustangs	50–78	Carleton Ravens	5–0
6	November 24	Windsor Lancers	73–81	Carleton Ravens	6–0
7	November 30	Carleton Ravens	71–68	Brock Badgers	7–0
8	December 1	Carleton Ravens	72–64	Guelph Gryphons	8–0
9	January 4	Laurentian Voyageurs	46–114	Carleton Ravens	9–0
10	January 5	York Lions	61–80	Carleton Ravens	10–0
11	January 11	Carleton Ravens	86–70	Toronto Varsity Blues	11–0
12	January 12	Carleton Ravens	101–60	Ryerson Rams	12–0
13	January 18	Carleton Ravens	73–54	York Lions	13–0
14	January 19	Carleton Ravens	101–76	Laurentian Voyageurs	14–0
15	January 25	Carleton Ravens	71–58	Queen's Golden Gaels	15–0
16	January 26	Carleton Ravens	70–66	Ottawa Gee-Gees*	16–0
17	January 29	Carleton Ravens	88–37	RMC Paladins	17–0
18	February 1	Toronto Varsity Blues	73–94	Carleton Ravens	18–0
19	February 2	Ryerson Rams	77–100	Carleton Ravens	19–0
20	February 8	RMC Paladins	27–113	Carleton Ravens	20–0
21	February 9	Queen's Golden Gaels	63–76	Carleton Ravens	21–0
22	February 13	Ottawa Gee-Gees	73–75	Carleton Ravens	22–0

* Game was played at Scotiabank Place and not at the University of Ottawa. (Capital Hoops Classic)

== OUA Playoffs ==
Date	Visitor	Score	Home	Event
February 23	Queen's Golden Gaels	44–96	Carleton Ravens	OUA East Semi-final
March 1	Ottawa Gee-Gees	56–75	Carleton Ravens	OUA East Final
March 8	Western Mustangs	65–81	Carleton Ravens	Wilson Cup Final

== CIS Final 8 ==
Date	Opponent	Score	Event
March 14	Alberta Golden Bears	66–57	Quarter-final
March 15	Acadia Axemen	80–82 (2OT)	Semi-final
