= 2008–09 Carleton Ravens men's basketball season =

The 2008-09 Carleton University Ravens men's basketball season began on August 28, 2007, with exhibition games against NCAA Division I teams, and with regular season games beginning on November 7. The season ended when the Ravens hosted the national championships at Scotiabank Place for the second time.

== Roster ==
#	Name	Pos.
3	Mike Kenny	Guard
10	Eliot Thompson	Guard
11	Dan Penner	Forward
13	Stuart Turnbull	Guard
15	Kyle Smendziuk	Forward
21	Derek McConnery	Forward
22	Cole Hobin	Guard
23	Anthony Ashe	Guard
31	Luke Chapman	Guard
33	Robert Saunders	Guard
41	Kevin Churchill	Forward
42	Aaron Doornekamp	Forward
43	Aaron Chapman	Forward
45	Kevin McCleery	Forward

Coach: Dave Smart

== Pre-season ==
Exhibition games against NCAA Division I Teams

Date	Opponent	Score
Aug. 28	Northeastern Huskies	77–47
Aug. 30	Kansas Jayhawks	83–84
Aug. 31	South Alabama Jaguars	78–59
Sept. 1	Buffalo Bulls	84–74

Exhibition games against Canadian colleges

Date	Opponent	Score
Oct. 1	St. Lawrence College Vikings	112–77

House-Laughton Tournament

Date	Opponent	Score
Oct. 17	Bishop's Gaiters	102–53
Oct. 18	Laval Rouge et Or	73–60
Oct. 19	Victoria Vikes	73–64

Exhibition games on the road

Date	Opponent	Score
Nov. 1	Cincinnati Bearcats	54–64
Nov. 3	MSU Eagles	69–84

Rod Shoveller Memorial Tournament at Dalhousie University

Date	Opponent	Score
Jan. 2	Dalhousie Tigers	80–67
Jan. 3	Dalhousie Tigers	69–57
Jan. 4	Dalhousie Tigers	83–61

== Regular season ==
#	Date	Visitor	Home	Score	Record
1	Nov. 7	Carleton Ravens	Windsor Lancers	68-70	0–1
2	Nov. 8	Carleton Ravens	Western Ontario Mustangs	79-74	1-1
3	Nov. 14	Lakehead Thunderwolves	Carleton Ravens	78-57	2–1
4	Nov. 15	McMaster Marauders	Carleton Ravens	74-49	3–1
5	Nov. 21	Guelph Gryphons	Carleton Ravens	64-48	4–1
6	Nov. 22	Brock Badgers	Carleton Ravens	92-67	5–1
7	Nov. 28	Carleton Ravens	Wilfrid Laurier Golden Hawks	78-55	6–1
8	Nov. 29	Carleton Ravens	Waterloo Warriors	83–76	7–1
9	Jan. 9	Varsity Blues	Carleton Ravens	81-68	8–1
10	Jan. 10	Ryerson Rams	Carleton Ravens	96-60	9–1
11	Jan. 16	Carleton Ravens	Laurentian Voyageurs	110-58	10–1
12	Jan. 17	Carleton Ravens	York Lions	89-72	11–1
13	Jan. 23	Carleton Ravens	RMC Paladins	118-71	12–1
14	Jan. 24	Carleton Ravens	Queen's Gaels	100-75	13–1
15	Jan. 28	Ottawa Gee Gees	Carleton Ravens (at Scotiabank Place)	87-72	14–1
16	Jan. 30	York Lions	Carleton Ravens	104-82	15–1
17	Jan. 31	Laurentian Voyageurs	Carleton Ravens	107-56	16–1
18	Feb. 6	Carleton Ravens	Ryerson Rams	98-62	17–1
19	Feb. 7	Carleton Ravens	Varsity Blues	74-54	18–1
20	Feb. 13	Queen's Gaels	Carleton Ravens	85-43	19–1
21	Feb. 14	RMC Paladins	Carleton Ravens	119-45	20–1
22	Feb. 21	Carleton Ravens	Ottawa Gee Gees	76-69	21–1

== OUA Playoffs ==
Date	Visitor	Home	Score	Event
Feb. 28	York Lions	Carleton Ravens	105-57	OUA East Semi Final
Mar. 4	Ottawa Gee Gees	Carleton Ravens	82-61	OUA East Final
Mar. 7	Carleton Ravens	Western Ontario Mustangs	71-57	Wilson Cup Final

== CIS Final 8 ==
Date	Opponent	Score	Event
Mar. 13	St. Francis Xavier X-Men	94-57	Quarter-final
Mar. 14	Western Ontario Mustangs	66-65	Semi-final
Mar. 15	UBC Thunderbirds	87-77	Final
