= Robert Smart =

Robert Smart may refer to:

- Robert Smart (Royal Navy officer)
- Robert Borlase Smart, English artist
- Robert W. Smart, American artist
- Rob Smart, Canadian basketball coach and player
