= Lloyd Pandi =

Canadian basketball player (born 1999)

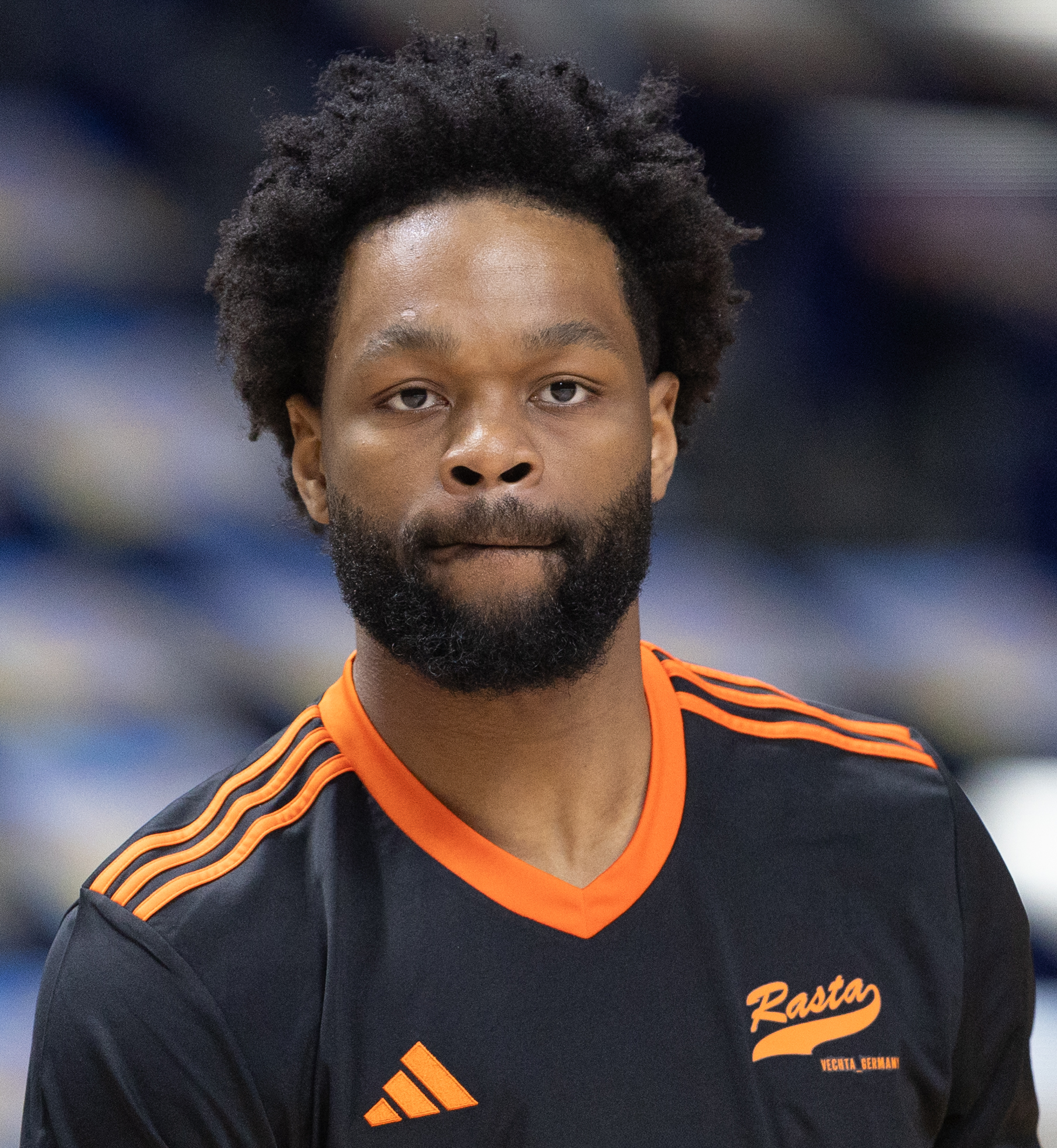
- Pandi in 2026 with Rasta Vechta

No. 2 – Rasta Vechta
- Position: Shooting guard / point guard
- League: Basketball Bundesliga

Personal information
- Born: December 10, 1999 (age 26) Ottawa, Ontario, Canada
- Listed height: 6 ft 4 in (1.93 m)
- Listed weight: 191 lb (87 kg)

Career information
- High school: Ashbury College (Ottawa, Ontario); Bull City Preparatory Academy (Durham, North Carolina)
- College: Carleton (2019–2022)
- Playing career: 2022–present

Career history
- 2020: Ottawa Blackjacks
- 2021: Niagara River Lions
- 2022–2024: Darüşşafaka
- 2023: →Niagara River Lions
- 2024: →Ottawa Blackjacks
- 2024–present: Rasta Vechta
- 2026: →Vancouver Bandits

Career highlights
- CEBL Defensive Player of the Year (2024); CEBL steals leader (2024); 2x U Sports Champion (2020, 2022); U Sports Most Valuable Player (2022); U Sports All-Canadian First Team All-Star (2022); 2x OUA First Team All Star (2020, 2022); 2x CEBL x U Sports Player of the Year (2020, 2021); 2x Ravens Scoring Leader (2020, 2022); U Sports All-Canadian Second Team All-Star (2020); U Sports Rookie of the Year (2020)

Lloyd Kanda Pandi (born December 10, 1999) is a Canadian professional basketball player for Rasta Vechta of the Basketball Bundesliga (BBL). He played university basketball for Carleton.

== University career ==
In his debut for Carleton, Pandi had 18 points to help defeat Waterloo 110-54, leading all Carleton starters with 22 minutes played. In his debut season, Pandi started 17 games out of the season's 22 games, eventually becoming a national champion with the Ravens as well as being named the U Sports Rookie of the Year. At the close of the season, Pandi was the Ravens' scoring leader, having played 19 of the 22 regular season games, as well as Canada's leading university player in field goal percentage.

In the summer following his debut season, Pandi was selected as one of the 21 university players invited to participate in the Canadian Elite Basketball League (CEBL) inaugural season, playing for the Ottawa Blackjacks. At the close of the summer season, Pandi was named the league's CEBL U Sports Player of the Year. The following year, the U Sports season was suspended due to the COVID-19 pandemic. However, Pandi was once again selected as one of the 21 university players participating in the CEBL, this time playing for the Niagara River Lions. At the end of that season, he was once again named the CEBL U Sports Player of the Year.

On April 10, 2022, Lloyd Pandi announced via social media that he will no longer be playing for the Carleton Ravens and enter the 2022 NBA draft. In his second and last season with the Ravens, Pandi won the national U Sports Championship a second time and received the national award for U Sports Player of the Year (Mike Moser Most Valuable Player Award).

== Professional career ==
On December 12, 2022, he signed with Darüşşafaka of the Turkish Basketbol Süper Ligi (BSL).

On September 5, 2024, he signed with Rasta Vechta of the Basketball Bundesliga (BBL).

On June 20, 2026, Pandi signed with Vancouver Bandits of the Canadian Elite Basketball League (CEBL).

== National team career ==
On August 23, 2022, Pandi got his first call to the Canadian national team as part of the country's 2022 FIBA AmeriCup roster. He went on to average 5.7 points and 2.8 rebounds over an average of 19.1 minutes across 6 games. Canada finished 4th in the competition.

== Career statistics ==
Legend
GP	Games played	GS	Games started	MPG	Minutes per game
FG%	Field goal percentage	3P%	3-point field goal percentage	FT%	Free throw percentage
RPG	Rebounds per game	APG	Assists per game	SPG	Steals per game
BPG	Blocks per game	PPG	Points per game	**Bold**	Career high

=== College ===
Year	Team	GP	GS	MPG	FG%	3P%	FT%	RPG	APG	SPG	BPG	PPG
2019–20	Carleton	**19**	**17**	23.2	**.663**	.800	.768	5.9	1.8	1.2	**0.6**	**15.9**
2021–22	Carleton	14	14	**27.1**	.547	.500	**.833**	**8.1**	**3.1**	**1.7**	0.4	14.7

=== CEBL ===
Year	Team	GP	GS	MPG	FG%	3P%	FT%	RPG	APG	SPG	BPG	PPG
2020	Ottawa	6	0	**23.0**	**.486**	–	.571	**5.3**	1.3	1.3	**0.5**	**8.3**
2021	Niagara	**16**	**9**	22.0	.449	**.429**	**.595**	3.3	**2.7**	**1.5**	0.2	7.6
