= Philip Scrubb =

Canadian-British basketball player

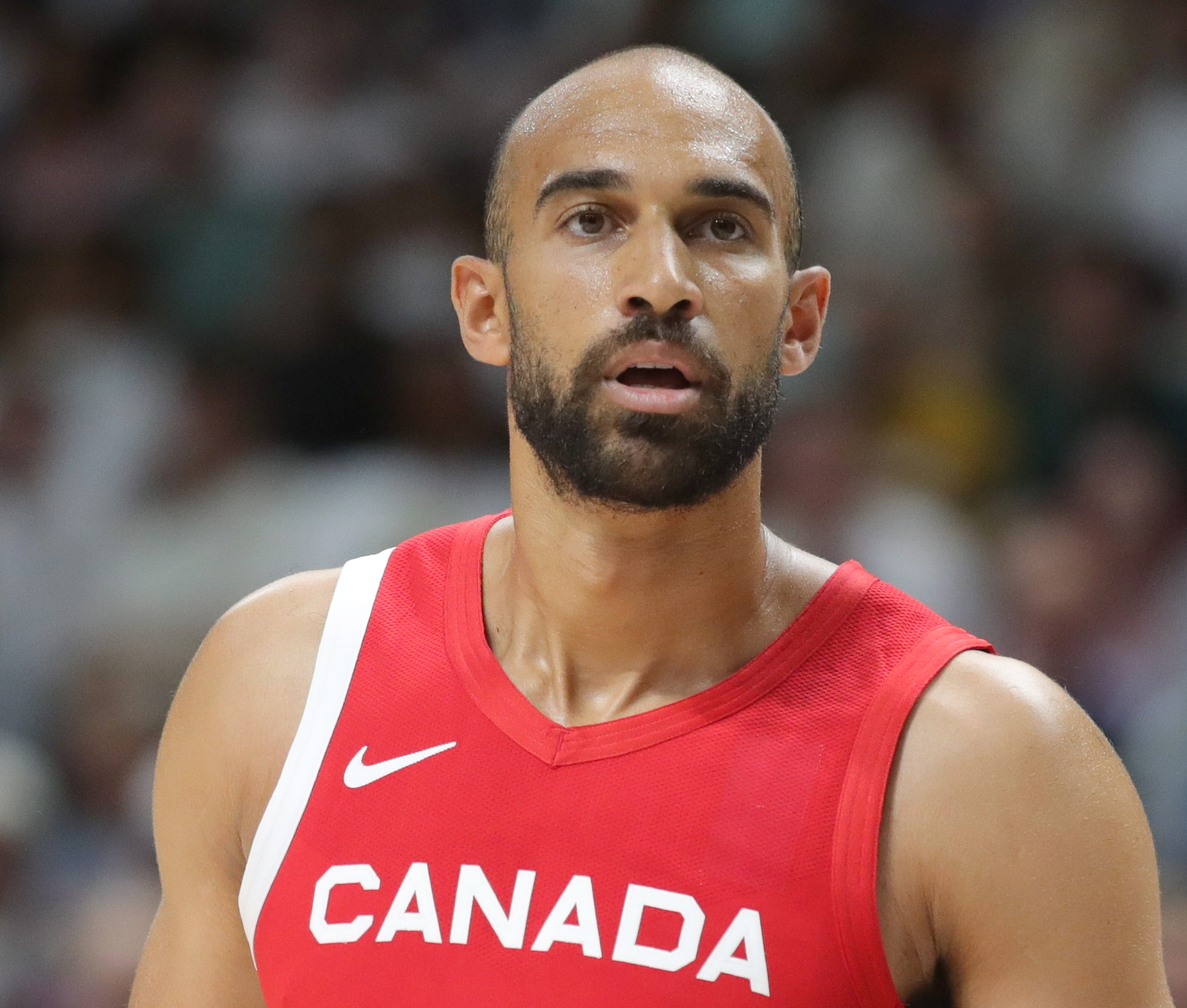
- Scrubb with Canada in 2023

No. 23 – Soles de Mexicali
- Position: Point guard / shooting guard
- League: LNBP

Personal information
- Born: 27 November 1992 (age 33) Richmond, British Columbia, Canada
- Listed height: 6 ft 4.5 in (1.94 m)
- Listed weight: 185 lb (84 kg)

Career information
- High school: Vancouver College (Vancouver, British Columbia)
- College: Carleton (2010–2015)
- NBA draft: 2015: undrafted
- Playing career: 2015–present

Career history
- 2015: AEK Athens
- 2015–2018: Skyliners Frankfurt
- 2018–2019: Zenit Saint Petersburg
- 2019–2020: Estudiantes
- 2020–2021: Limoges CSP
- 2021: Niagara River Lions
- 2021–2022: Avtodor
- 2022–2023: Monbus Obradoiro
- 2023–2024: Bahçeşehir Koleji
- 2024–2025: Leyma Coruña
- 2025: Petkim Spor
- 2025–2026: Palmer Basket
- 2026–present: Soles de Mexicali

Career highlights
- FIBA Europe Cup champion (2016); German BBL Top Scorer (2018); German BBL Best Offensive Player (2018); All-German BBL Second Team (2018); 5× CIS champion (2011–2015); CIS Male Athlete of the Year (2014); 3× CIS Most Outstanding Player (2012–2014); 2× CIS Tournament MVP (2012, 2015); 4× CIS First-Team All-Canadian (2012–2015); CIS Rookie of the Year (2011); Lois and Doug Mitchell Award Winner (2014)
Medals
Men's basketball
Representing Canada
FIBA World Cup
Bronze medal – third place	2023 Philippines–Japan–Indonesia
FIBA AmeriCup
Bronze medal – third place	2015 Mexico City

Philip Alexander Scrubb (born 27 November 1992) is a Canadian professional basketball player for Soles de Mexicali of the Liga Nacional de Baloncesto Profesional (LNBP). During his university basketball career, he won five CIS championships with the Carleton University Ravens, before embarking on a professional career. Scrubb is considered one of the greatest players in CIS basketball history.

== High school career ==
Scrubb played high school basketball at Vancouver College, under the basketball coach Bill Disbrow.

== University career ==
Scrubb's career is perhaps the most accomplished in the history of Canadian Interuniversity Sport basketball. In 2010, Scrubb joined a powerhouse Carleton Ravens team at Carleton University that had won the Canadian men’s university basketball championship in six of the previous eight years. He averaged 13.1 points per game, and helped the Ravens to a perfect 22–0 record, and their seventh national championship. Scrubb was named an OUA East Second Team All-Star, and earned the Dr. Peter Mullins Trophy as CIS Rookie of the Year.

In his second season at Carleton, Scrubb led the Ravens to another 22–0 season, and earned the Mike Moser Memorial Trophy as the Outstanding Player in the CIS. He also was awarded the Jack Donohue Trophy as MVP of the CIS Championship Tournament, as the Ravens took the national title again.

Scrubb won his second Moser Trophy the following year, and took the award again after the 2013–14 season. He is the only three-time recipient of the award in CIS history. In his final season at Carleton, Scrubb led the Ravens to their fifth consecutive national title, and earned his second Donohue Trophy as playoff MVP. He also was selected First Team All-Canadian for the fourth consecutive year. During his five years at Carleton, the Ravens had a won-lost record of 102–3. He and his brother Thomas dominated CIS basketball during their time with the Ravens.

=== University statistics ===
Year	Team	GP	GS	MPG	FG%	3P%	FT%	RPG	APG	SPG	BPG	PPG
2010–11	Carleton	22	20	25.1	42.8	40.5	86.4	3.1	2.8	1.1	0.3	13.1
2011–12	Carleton	22	21	23.5	55.7	57.0	81.9	2.5	3.3	1.2	0.2	16.2
2012–13	Carleton	20	19	29.0	45.9	42.6	86.0	3.3	3.5	1.6	0.4	18.6
2013–14	Carleton	22	20	27.5	49.2	47.0	87.4	3.2	4.9	0.5	0.3	18.6
2014–15	Carleton	19	18	25.3	48.3	48.7	90.0	3.3	4.5	1.3	0.1	16.6
Career		105	98	26.0	48.4	46.8	86.4	3.1	3.8	1.1	0.2	16.6

== Professional career ==
After finishing the season at Carleton, Scrubb signed with Entersport, a professional basketball agency. In July 2015, Scrubb played with the NBA Summer League teams of the Memphis Grizzlies and the Toronto Raptors. In August 2015, Scrubb began his professional career with the Greek League club AEK Athens, after signing a two-year contract with them. In the winter of 2016, he moved to Germany, after he was loaned by AEK to the German Bundesliga club, the Skyliners Frankfurt. On 1 May 2016, he captured the FIBA Europe Cup title with the Skyliners, tallying six points, three rebounds and two assists in the championship game.

The Frankfurt team exercised an option in June 2016, to keep Scrubb for the 2016–17 season. However, he missed the beginning of the season, due to problems with his knee; and in December 2016, the Skyliners announced that Scrubb had to undergo surgery to repair the knee injury, after the failure of conservative treatment, and that he would be out for between six and nine months. He returned to the Frankfurt team for the 2017–18 season. In April 2018, Scrubb won the BBL Best Offensive Player award. Scrubb was the Basketball Bundesliga Top Scorer as well, as he averaged 18.3 points per game on his way to leading Frankfurt to the playoffs as the eighth-seed.

On 18 July 2018, Scrubb signed a one-year deal with Zenit Saint Petersburg of the VTB United League. On 17 July 2019, Scrubb signed a one-year deal with Spanish club Movistar Estudiantes. Scrubb averaged 9.4 points per game. On 23 July 2020, he signed with Limoges CSP of the LNB Pro A.

On 14 May 2021, Scrubb signed with the Niagara River Lions of the Canadian Elite Basketball League.

On 17 August 2021, Scrubb signed with the Russian team BC Avtodor of the VTB United League. he averaged 11.9 points, 2.0 rebounds and 3.8 assists per game. He left the team after the 2022 Russian invasion of Ukraine.

On 9 March 2022, Scrubb signed with Monbus Obradoiro of the Liga ACB.

On 13 April 2023, Scrubb re-signed with the Niagara River Lions, but didn't play for them. On 10 August, he signed with Bahçeşehir Koleji of the Basketbol Süper Ligi.

In August 2024, Scrubb returned to the Spanish league, signing with newly-promoted Leyma Coruña.

On October 13, 2025, he signed with Petkim Spor of the Basketbol Süper Ligi (BSL).

On December 24, 2025, he signed for Palmer Basket of the Spanish Primera FEB.

== National team career ==
Scrubb represented Canada's national teams on the international stage several times: He helped Canada’s Under-18 junior national team win a bronze medal at the 2010 FIBA Americas Under-18 Championship, and also played for Team Canada Under-19 at the 2011 FIBA Under-19 World Cup. The same year, he made Canada’s roster for the 2011 Pan American Games. Scrubb also played at the 2013 World University Games,

=== Canadian senior national team ===
In 2015, Scrubb helped the senior men's Canadian national basketball team win the Marchand Cup, and capture bronze at the 2015 FIBA Americas Championship. He also played for the senior men's Team Canada at the 2016 FIBA World Olympic Qualifying Tournament in Manila, at the 2019 FIBA World Cup, and was part of the Team Canada roster that won the bronze medal in the 2023 FIBA World Cup.

== Personal ==
Scrubb is of British descent. His brother, Thomas, is also a professional basketball player.
