= 2023 U Sports Men's Basketball Championship =

Canadian university basketball championship

- Season: 2022-23
- Teams: 8
- Finals site: Scotiabank Centre; Halifax, Nova Scotia
- Champions: Carleton Ravens (17th title)
- Runner-up: St. Francis Xavier X-Men
- Winning coach: Taffe Charles (3rd title)
- Tournament MVP: Aiden Warnholtz (Carleton)
- Attendance: 40,092
- Television: CBC

The 2023 U Sports Men's Final 8 Basketball Tournament was the 60th edition of the U Sports men's basketball championship, a postseason tournament to determine the national champion of the 2022 U Sports men's basketball season. The tournament started on March 10 and ended with the bronze-medal and championship games being played on March 12 in Halifax, Nova Scotia.

The defending champion Carleton Ravens entered the tournament ranked third, following a loss in the Ontario provincial championship game to the Ottawa Gee-Gees. However, the Ravens overcame three teams in this tournament, including Ottawa in the semi-finals, and the St. Francis Xavier X-Men in the first ever double-overtime final, to claim their 17th national title.

The game set a record for the highest number of points scored by a single team in the championship game (men or women)—109—and the highest number of combined points in the title game (men or women)—213.

Both the Carleton men’s and women’s teams won the national titles in basketball this season, something no school had accomplished since 1985, when the Victoria Vikes were double champions. It was Carleton's fourth straight crown, 11th of the last 12, and 17th of the last 20. They remain the winningest top division school in Canada or the United States.

== Venue ==
The tournament was held at the Scotiabank Centre for the fourth time in seven years, and was the 33rd time the tournament was played in Halifax.

The tournament was hosted by St. Francis Xavier University, the second time the school hosted the championship, after previously doing so in 1968. St. Francis Xavier was originally awarded the hosting rights for the 2021 championship, but that tournament was cancelled due to the COVID-19 pandemic in Canada.

== Participating teams ==
Seed	Team	Qualified	Record	Last	Total
1	Victoria Vikes	Canada West Champion	17–3	1997	8
2	Ottawa Gee-Gees	OUA Champion	17–5	None	0
3	Carleton Ravens	OUA Finalist	18–4	2022	16
4	St. Francis Xavier X-Men	AUS Champion (Host)	17–3	2001	3
5	Queen's Gaels	OUA Semifinalist (At-large berth)	17–5	None	0
6	UQAM Citadins	RSEQ Champion	10–6	None	0
7	Winnipeg Wesmen	Canada West Finalist	15–5	None	0
8	UPEI Panthers	AUS Finalist	15–5	None	0

== Championship bracket ==
First Round: March 10
1	Victoria Vikes	93
8	UPEI Panthers	92
4	St. Francis Xavier X-Men	107
5	Queen's Gaels	98
2	Ottawa Gee-Gees	91
7	Winnipeg Wesmen	70
3	Carleton Ravens	73
6	UQAM Citadins	71

Semi-Finals: March 11
1	Victoria Vikes	64
4	St. Francis Xavier X-Men	77
2	Ottawa Gee-Gees	75
3	Carleton Ravens	81

Gold Medal Game: March 12
3	Carleton Ravens	109 (2OT)
4	St. Francis Xavier X-Men	104
Bronze Medal Game: March 12
1	Victoria Vikes	58
2	Ottawa Gee-Gees	78

== Consolation bracket ==
Semi-Finals: March 11
5	Queen's Gaels	93
8	UPEI Panthers	68
6	UQAM Citadins	90 (2OT)
7	Winnipeg Wesmen	85

Fifth Place Game: March 12
5	Queen's Gaels	85
6	UQAM Citadins	89
