= Dave Smart =

Canadian basketball coach (born 1965)

Pacific Tigers
- Position: Head coach
- Conference: West Coast Conference

Personal information
- Born: August 14, 1965 (age 61) Kingston, Ontario, Canada

Career information
- College: Queen's (1991–1994)
- Coaching career: 1997–present

Career history

Coaching
- 1997–1999: Carleton (assistant)
- 1999–2015, 2016–2019: Carleton
- 2023–2024: Texas Tech (assistant)
- 2024–present: Pacific

Career highlights
- As head coach: 13× U Sports Basketball Championship (2003–2007, 2009, 2011–2015, 2017, 2019); 9× OUA Conference Championship (2003–2005, 2009, 2012, 2013, 2015, 2018, 2019); 9× Stuart W. Aberdeen Memorial Trophy (2003, 2005, 2009, 2011–2014, 2017, 2018); 13× OUA Coach of the Year (2001–2003, 2005, 2009–2014, 2017–2019)

David Charles Smart (born August 14, 1965) is a Canadian college basketball coach who is the head coach of the Pacific Tigers men's basketball team, in Stockton, California. Regarded as the most successful Canadian university coach of all time, Smart was the head coach of the Carleton Ravens from 1999 to 2019, leading them to 13 Canadian Interuniversity Sport/U Sports national championships. During his 18 seasons at Carleton, he also led the Ravens to 11 Ontario University Athletics (OUA) championships — the most by any coach in conference history. Smart has also served as an assistant coach with the Canadian men's national team on multiple occasions, working with head coaches Leo Rautins and Jay Triano.

Smart also spent time as an assistant coach, and later Director of Basketball Operations at Carleton, and has served as a consultant to the coaching staff for the Ottawa Senators of the National Hockey League.

== Early life and education ==
Smart was born in Kingston, Ontario, and attended Queen's University, where he graduated with a degree in sociology. He played three seasons of varsity basketball for the Queen's Golden Gaels, from 1991–94. He set the all-time school record for highest points per game career average (26.6). Smart also set the highest single-game Queen's scoring mark (43 points). His career average is one of the highest ever recorded in Canadian university basketball. In the 1992–93 season, Smart became the only Queen's player ever to lead Canada in scoring average, with an average of 29.4 points per game. He was selected a first team Ontario University Athletics All-Star in all three of seasons.

Smart coached extensively at the high school and club levels, before attending university, and again as a university student, including at Nepean High School where he coached the team to a city championship and a berth at OFSAA.

== Coaching career ==
=== Carleton (1997–2019) ===
==== Assistant coach (1997–1999) ====
After being rejected for the vacant Queen's men's basketball head coaching job following the 1994 season, Smart was hired as an assistant coach at Carleton University, under head coach Paul Armstrong, and served for two years in that role. Smart became the head coach at Carleton in 1999, when Armstrong was promoted into management.

==== Head coach promotion & historical run (1999–2015) ====
Smart led the Carleton Ravens to five consecutive Canadian Interuniversity Sport national championships from 2003–07. These were the first CIS championships won by Carleton in any sport.

The Ravens' five-year championship streak was broken in 2008 when they were upset 82–80 in double overtime in the CIS semifinals by the Acadia Axemen; the Ravens, seeded first, had been 32–0 in that season. Carleton then won the 2009 CIS Basketball Championship, the school's sixth, hosted at Scotiabank Place in Ottawa, making the Ravens 19–1 in CIS Final Eight play since 2003.

Carleton lost in the 2010 CIS semifinals to the eventual champion Saskatchewan Huskies; this tournament was also hosted at Scotiabank Place.

The CIS Men's Basketball Championships returned to Halifax, Nova Scotia, in 2011, after three years at Scotiabank Place in Ottawa, and Smart and the Ravens captured their seventh CIS National Championship in nine years with a victory over Trinity Western Spartans. Smart and the Ravens captured their eighth CIS National Championship, defeating the Alberta Golden Bears in the 2012 edition of the championship tournament. The CIS National Men's Basketball Championships returned to Ottawa in 2013, and Smart's Ravens won their ninth title, defeating Lakehead Thunderwolves, 92–42. The Ravens set Canadian university basketball records for largest winning margin (50 points) and fewest points allowed (42 points) in a championship final, and broke the tie with the University of Victoria for the most total championships won in Canadian men's university basketball.

In 2014, Carleton defeated cross-town rivals Ottawa Gee-Gees 79–67 to win their tenth CIS National Men's Basketball Championship under Smart's tenure. Carleton defeated the Gee-Gees in a rematch the following year, for the 2015 CIS Final 8 National Men's Basketball Championship, by a score of 93–46, claiming Carleton's eleventh championship in men's basketball.

==== Sabbatical & return to coach duties (2015–2019) ====
On July 31, 2015, Smart took a sabbatical from head coaching duties, and his nephew, Rob Smart, was named interim head coach. Led by Rob Smart, and after losing four starters from the previous year's championship, Carleton defeated the Calgary Dinos in the 2016 CIS final by a score of 101–79. This was the Ravens' 12th CIS championship win overall, and 6th consecutive championship win.

Smart returned from his sabbatical, and resumed his position as head coach for the 2016–2017 season. The Ravens captured their seventh consecutive national championship, thirteenth overall, and twelfth for Smart, defeating the Ryerson Rams 78–69. The seventh consecutive championship by the Ravens matched the record at the Canadian university sports level, set by the University of Victoria. On March 10, 2019, Coach Smart and the Ravens won the school's fourteenth men's basketball National Championship (and fifteenth basketball National Championship overall), defeating the Calgary Dinos 83–49.

On March 19, 2019, Smart stepped down as head coach of the team, accepting a new position as their director of basketball operations. Former Ravens women's basketball head coach Taffe Charles was named Smart's replacement. Smart's head-coaching record at Carleton was 591 wins, 48 losses.

=== Texas Tech (2023–2024, assistant) ===
On July 25, 2023, Smart accepted the position of assistant basketball coach at Texas Tech University, under head coach Grant McCasland. The Red Raiders went 23–11 and earned a No. 6 seed in the NCAA tournament, but fell to No. 11 NC State in the first round.

=== Pacific (2024–present) ===
On March 27, 2024, Smart was announced as the head coach of the Pacific men's basketball program.

In his first year at Pacific, the Tigers went 9-24 overall and 4-14 in WCC Conference play, improving from the previous season records of 6-26 overall and 0-19 within their division.

== National team career ==
On April 8, 2012, Smart was named the head coach of the Great Britain U20 men's team.

On February 20, 2018, Smart was hired as head coach of the Canada's U18 men's team ahead of the 2018 FIBA Under-18 Americas Championship. Canada ultimately reached the finals, losing to the United States 113–74.

== Executive career ==
=== Carleton University ===
With Taffe Charles as head coach and Smart as Director of Basketball Operations, Carleton won its fifteenth national championship in men's basketball, defeating the Dalhousie Tigers 74–65, on March 8, 2020. Charles became the first black head coach to win a Canadian national championship in men's basketball, and the first head coach to win Canadian national championships in both women's and men's basketball. Carleton won two more National Championships with Smart as director of basketball operations.

=== Ottawa Senators ===
Smart was hired by the Ottawa Senators of the National Hockey League to serve as a consultant to the coaching staff during the 2019–20 season. Smart served as a guest speaker for the Senators in several of their summer rookie camps, before being hired as a coaching consultant for the team. Smart's focus will be on defensive mindsets, and player attitude and personality.

=== Ottawa Blackjacks ===
Smart was named the inaugural general manager of the expansion Ottawa Blackjacks of the CEBL on December 18, 2019. Smart retained his position of Director of Basketball Operations at Carleton University, concurrent with his duties with the Blackjacks. Smart stepped down as general manager of the Blackjacks on August 18, 2020.

== Awards and achievements ==
In the 2003, 2005, 2009, 2011, 2012, 2013, 2014, 2017 and 2018 seasons, Smart was awarded the Stewart W. Aberdeen Memorial Trophy, as the top men's basketball coach in Canadian university sports. Smart won OUA coach-of-the-year awards thirteen times, for the 2001, 2002, 2003, 2005, 2009, 2010, 2011, 2012, 2013, 2014, 2017, 2018, and 2019 seasons.

Smart won 92 percent of his games against Canadian opposition between 1999 and 2019. He led the Ravens to a Canadian men's record of 87 consecutive wins in league and playoff games, from 2002 to 2005.

Smart was inducted into the Order of Ottawa by Mayor Jim Watson on November 17, 2016.

He was inducted into the Ottawa Sport Hall of Fame in 2021.

On July 2, 2026, Basketball Canada announced that Dave Smart will be inducted into the Canadian Basketball Hall of Fame

== Head coaching record ==
=== CIS/U Sports ===
Record table
| Season | Team | Overall | Conference | Standing | Postseason |
|---|---|---|---|---|---|
Carleton Ravens (OUA East) (1999–2015)
| 1999–00 | Carleton | 13–14 | 11–9 | 3rd | |
| 2000–01 | Carleton | 31–5 | 21–1 | 1st | CIS Consolation Final |
| 2001–02 | Carleton | 27–5 | 19–3 | 1st | |
| 2002–03 | Carleton | 33–1 | 21–1 | 1st | CIS Champion |
| 2003–04 | Carleton | 34–1 | 22–0 | 1st | CIS Champion |
| 2004–05 | Carleton | 34–1 | 22–0 | 1st | CIS Champion |
| 2005–06 | Carleton | 30–4 | 20–2 | 1st | CIS Champion |
| 2006–07 | Carleton | 32–4 | 19–3 | 1st | CIS Champion |
| 2007–08 | Carleton | 32–1 | 22–0 | 1st | CIS Semifinals |
| 2008–09 | Carleton | 36–1 | 21–1 | 1st | CIS Champion |
| 2009–10 | Carleton | 30–3 | 20–2 | 1st | CIS Semifinals |
| 2010–11 | Carleton | 34–1 | 22–0 | 1st | CIS Champion |
| 2011–12 | Carleton | 34–0 | 22–0 | 1st | CIS Champion |
| 2012–13 | Carleton | 31–1 | 19–1 | 1st | CIS Champion |
| 2013–14 | Carleton | 33–1 | 22–0 | 1st | CIS Champion |
| 2014–15 | Carleton | 29–2 | 17–2 | 1st | CIS Champion |
| Carleton: | | 493–45 (.916) | 320–25 (.928) | | |
Carleton Ravens (OUA North/OUA East) (2016–2019)
| 2016–17 | Carleton | 30–1 | 19–0 | 1st | U Sports Champion |
| 2017–18 | Carleton | 34–1 | 23–0 | 1st | U Sports Third Place |
| 2018–19 | Carleton | 34–1 | 22–1 | 1st | U Sports Champion |
| Carleton: | | 98–3 (.970) | 64–1 (.985) | | |
| Total: | | 591–48 (.925) | | | |
National champion Postseason invitational champion Conference regular season champion Conference regular season and conference tournament champion Division regular season champion Division regular season and conference tournament champion Conference tournament champion

=== NCAA ===
Record table
| Season | Team | Overall | Conference | Standing | Postseason |
|---|---|---|---|---|---|
Pacific Tigers (West Coast Conference) (2024–present)
| 2024–25 | Pacific | 9–24 | 4–14 | T–9th | |
| 2025–26 | Pacific | 18–15 | 8–10 | T–5th | |
| 2026–27 | Pacific | 5–1 | 0–0 | | |
| Pacific: | | 32–40 (.444) | 12–24 (.333) | | |
| Total: | | 32–40 (.444) | | | |
National champion Postseason invitational champion Conference regular season champion Conference regular season and conference tournament champion Division regular season champion Division regular season and conference tournament champion Conference tournament champion
