= John Tripp (ice hockey) =

Canadian former ice hockey player

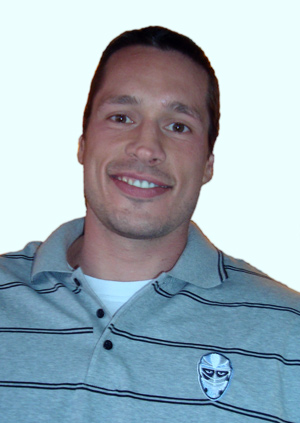
- Born: May 4, 1977 (age 49) Kingston, Ontario, Canada
- Height: 6 ft 2 in (188 cm)
- Weight: 215 lb (98 kg; 15 st 5 lb)
- Position: Right wing
- Shot: Right
- Played for: New York Rangers; Los Angeles Kings; Adler Mannheim; ERC Ingolstadt; Hamburg Freezers; Hannover Scorpions; Kölner Haie
- National team: Germany
- NHL draft: 77th overall, 1995; Colorado Avalanche; 42nd overall, 1997; Calgary Flames
- Playing career: 1997–2016

John Tripp (born May 4, 1977) is a Canadian-born German professional ice hockey coach and former player. He served as head coach at Braehead Clan until March 2018.

Tripp played 43 games in the National Hockey League for the New York Rangers and the Los Angeles Kings, before continuing his career in Germany.

== Playing career ==
Tripp was originally drafted by the Colorado Avalanche in the third round, 77th overall, in the 1995 NHL entry draft. He re-entered the draft two years later and was drafted by the Calgary Flames in the second round, 42nd overall. Despite being drafted by two different teams, both times fairly high in the draft selection, he would not see NHL level playing time until the 2002–03 season when he played nine games for the New York Rangers. The next season, 2003–04, Tripp played 34 games for the Los Angeles Kings.

In 2004, during the NHL lockout, Tripp moved to the Deutsche Eishockey Liga in Germany for Adler Mannheim. In 2006, he moved to ERC Ingolstadt before heading to the Hamburg Freezers in 2007. In this time Tripp was able to obtain German citizenship and represent Germany internationally.

After three seasons with the Freezers, Tripp left and signed an initial try-out contract with fellow German based club, the Hannover Scorpions on September 22, 2010. After three weeks John was released by the Scorpions but immediately signed a one-year contract for the remainder of the 2010–11 season with Kölner Haie on October 19, 2010. He then remained with the Haie team through the 2014-15 season, serving as team captain between 2011 and 2015.

Tripp played 11 seasons in the top flight DEL, before signing a one-year contract with second tier based, Eispiraten Crimmitschau of the DEL2 on September 8, 2015.

== International play ==
Tripp won 110 caps for the German national team between 2006 and 2014, scoring 28 goals and assisting on 15 more. He played in the 2010 Olympic Games in Vancouver and six World Championships, helping Germany to a semifinal appearance in 2010, the team's greatest success since winning bronze at the 1976 Olympics.

== Coaching career ==
On December 27, 2016, he accepted his first head coaching job at Eispiraten Crimmitschau of the German DEL2. His team had to go into the relegation round, where they overcame Rosenheim which allowed the Crimmitschau club to remain in the league. Tripp and the team parted ways after the conclusion of the 2016-17 season.

In May 2017, Tripp agreed a deal to become the new head coach of Braehead Clan in the UK's EIHL. He guided the Clan to a ninth-place finish in the regular season, his tenure ended in late March 2018. Tripp returned to his native Canada and started the Kingston Hockey Academy.

== Media career ==
Since January 2016, Tripp has been serving as co-host and analyst of CHL Centre Ice, a show dedicated to the Champions Hockey League (CHL), and as color commentator of CHL games. He was a member of the TSN broadcast crew at the 2017 IIHF World Championships.

== Personal life ==
He has been friends since his childhood with Jayna Hefford; both went to the same school.

Tripp's maternal grandparents immigrated from Germany to Canada in 1953. His nickname is Hans, after his German grandfather. Tripp was married to Taryn Turnbull, a former basketball player at Tulane University and in the German second division. His former brother-in-law, Stuart Turnbull, played professional basketball in Germany.

A cancer survivor himself, he founded Tripp Charity to raise money and awareness for children battling cancer.

== Career statistics ==
=== Regular season and playoffs ===
			Regular season					Playoffs
Season	Team	League	GP	G	A	Pts	PIM	GP	G	A	Pts	PIM
1993–94	St. Marys Lincolns	WOHL	42	15	29	44	116	—	—	—	—	—
1994–95	Oshawa Generals	OHL	58	6	11	17	53	7	0	1	1	4
1995–96	Oshawa Generals	OHL	56	13	14	27	95	5	1	1	2	13
1996–97	Oshawa Generals	OHL	59	28	20	48	126	18	16	10	26	42
1997–98	Roanoke Express	ECHL	9	0	2	2	22	—	—	—	—	—
1997–98	Saint John Flames	AHL	61	1	11	12	66	2	0	1	1	0
1998–99	Johnstown Chiefs	ECHL	7	2	0	2	12	—	—	—	—	—
1998–99	Saint John Flames	AHL	2	0	0	0	10	—	—	—	—	—
1999–00	Johnstown Chiefs	ECHL	38	13	11	24	64	—	—	—	—	—
1999–00	Saint John Flames	AHL	29	8	7	15	38	3	0	0	0	2
2000–01	Pensacola Ice Pilots	ECHL	36	19	14	33	110	—	—	—	—	—
2000–01	Houston Aeros	IHL	15	0	6	6	14	—	—	—	—	—
2000–01	Milwaukee Admirals	IHL	12	0	1	1	31	—	—	—	—	—
2000–01	Hershey Bears	AHL	5	0	1	1	0	—	—	—	—	—
2001–02	Pensacola Ice Pilots	ECHL	49	25	27	52	114	—	—	—	—	—
2001–02	Hartford Wolf Pack	AHL	23	4	9	13	22	10	4	2	6	17
2002–03	Hartford Wolf Pack	AHL	57	29	21	50	68	2	0	0	0	2
2002–03	New York Rangers	NHL	9	1	2	3	2	—	—	—	—	—
2003–04	Manchester Monarchs	AHL	24	8	7	15	33	—	—	—	—	—
2003–04	Los Angeles Kings	NHL	34	1	5	6	33	—	—	—	—	—
2004–05	Adler Mannheim	DEL	44	9	16	25	136	14	2	3	5	54
2005–06	Adler Mannheim	DEL	51	15	17	32	82	—	—	—	—	—
2006–07	ERC Ingolstadt	DEL	39	15	19	34	94	6	2	3	5	22
2007–08	Hamburg Freezers	DEL	50	15	20	35	93	7	0	3	3	12
2008–09	Hamburg Freezers	DEL	44	9	11	20	52	9	3	3	6	10
2009–10	Hamburg Freezers	DEL	53	16	17	33	99	—	—	—	—	—
2010–11	Hannover Scorpions	DEL	6	3	1	4	6	—	—	—	—	—
2010–11	Kölner Haie	DEL	37	11	14	25	36	5	1	1	2	10
2011–12	Kölner Haie	DEL	52	14	16	30	45	6	1	3	4	20
2012–13	Kölner Haie	DEL	52	17	20	37	62	12	3	5	8	16
2013–14	Kölner Haie	DEL	45	12	10	22	55	16	1	3	4	8
2014–15	Kölner Haie	DEL	48	9	6	15	75	—	—	—	—	—
2015–16	Eispiraten Crimmitschau	DEL2	42	18	22	40	65	3	0	0	0	4
AHL totals			201	50	56	106	237	17	4	3	7	21
NHL totals			43	2	7	9	35	—	—	—	—	—
DEL totals			521	145	167	312	835	75	13	24	37	152

=== International ===
Year	Team	Event	Result	GP	G	A	Pts	PIM
2007	Germany	WC	9th	6	1	2	3	2
2008	Germany	WC	10th	6	0	1	1	0
2009	Germany	OGQ	Q	3	3	0	3	4
2010	Germany	OG	11th	4	1	0	1	2
2010	Germany	WC	4th	9	0	0	0	6
2011	Germany	WC	7th	7	3	1	4	4
2012	Germany	WC	12th	7	1	0	1	2
2013	Germany	WC	9th	7	1	1	2	2
Senior totals				49	10	5	15	22
