= 2006 CIS Men's Basketball Championship =

Canadian university basketball championship

The 2006 CIS Men's Basketball Championship was held March 16-19, 2006.

The Carleton Ravens won their fourth straight national title.

== Bracket ==
Round of 16
7 | CBU Capers | 62
10 | Laurier Golden Hawks | 53
8 | York Lions | 74
9 | Saskatchewan Huskies | 75

Quarterfinals
3 | Carleton Ravens | 62
6 | UQAM Citadins | 59
2 | UBC Thunderbirds | 62
7 | CBU Capers | 80
4 | St. Francis Xavier X-Men | 81 (OT)
5 | McMaster Marauders | 77
1 | Victoria Vikes | 79
9 | Saskatchewan Huskies | 64

Semifinals
3 | Carleton Ravens | 68
7 | CBU Capers | 57
1 | Victoria Vikes | 67
4 | St. Francis Xavier X-Men | 63

Finals
1 | Victoria Vikes | 67
3 | Carleton Ravens | 73

== Tournament Awards ==
- MVP: Osvaldo Jeanty, Carleton
- All-stars:
  - Ryan Bell, Carleton
  - Brandon Ellis, Victoria
  - Jacob Doerksen, Victoria
  - Ryan Keliher, Cape Breton
  - Alexander Stephen, St. Francis Xavier
