= 2022 U Sports Men's Basketball Championship =

Canadian university basketball championship

- Season: 2021-22
- Teams: Eight
- Finals site: Saville Community Sports Centre; Edmonton, Alberta
- Champions: Carleton Ravens (16th title)
- Runner-up: Saskatchewan Huskies
- Winning coach: Taffe Charles
- Jack Donohue Trophy (tournament MVP): Alain Louis (Carleton Ravens)
- Television: CBC

The 2022 U Sports Men's Final 8 Basketball Tournament was held April 1–3, 2022, in Edmonton, Alberta, to determine a national champion for the 2021–22 U Sports men's basketball season.

Despite an undefeated regular season (12-0), the defending champion Carleton Ravens entered the tournament ranked seventh, following a loss in the Ontario provincial semi-final game (OUA East final) to the Queen's Gaels. However, the Ravens overcame three teams in this tournament to claim their 16th national title — their third straight crown, 10th of the last 11, and 16th of the last 19. They remain the winningest top division school in Canada or the United States.

== Host ==
The tournament was hosted by the University of Alberta for the first time in school history, and played at the Saville Community Sports Centre. This marks the only time the tournament has been held in Edmonton in the 59 years it’s been contested, and the fifth time in Alberta (the other four were in Calgary). This year's tournament was originally scheduled for March 10 to March 13, 2022, but was delayed three weeks due to ongoing pandemic issues.

== Participating teams ==
Seed	Team	Qualified	Record	Last	Total
1	Brock Badgers	OUA Champion	14–1	2008	2
2	Victoria Vikes	Canada West Champion	17–1	1997	8
3	Alberta Golden Bears	Canada West Finalist (Host)	16–0	2002	3
4	Dalhousie Tigers	AUS Champion	12–2	None	0
5	Queen's Gaels	OUA Finalist	9–5	None	0
6	McGill Redbirds	RSEQ Champion	12–0	None	0
7	Carleton Ravens	OUA Semifinalist (At-large berth)	14–0	2020	15
8	Saskatchewan Huskies	Canada West Bronze	11–5	2010	1

== Championship bracket ==
First Round: April 1
1	Brock Badgers	73
8	Saskatchewan Huskies	77
4	Dalhousie Tigers	80
5	Queen's Gaels	90
2	Victoria Vikes	77
7	Carleton Ravens	94
3	Alberta Golden Bears	85
6	McGill Redbirds	68

Semi-Finals: April 2
5	Queen's Gaels	60
8	Saskatchewan Huskies	86
3	Alberta Golden Bears	63
7	Carleton Ravens	64

Gold Medal Game: April 3
7	Carleton Ravens	85
8	Saskatchewan Huskies	72
Bronze Medal Game: April 3
3	Alberta Golden Bears	95
5	Queen's Gaels	84

== Consolation bracket ==
Semi-Finals: April 2
1	Brock Badgers	77
4	Dalhousie Tigers	90
2	Victoria Vikes	77
6	McGill Redbirds	68

Fifth Place Game: April 3
2	Victoria Vikes	72
4	Dalhousie Tigers	98
