= Rob Smart =

Canadian basketball coach and former player

Robert Smart (born 1978) is a Canadian basketball coach and former professional player. As an interim head coach, he guided the Carleton Ravens to the 2016 U Sports national championship. He is the nephew of Dave Smart and cousins with Aaron Doornekamp and Ben Doornekamp.

== Career ==
Growing up in Napanee, Ontario, Smart played basketball at Ernestown Secondary School, before enrolling at Simon Fraser University of the NAIA where he played from 1997 to 1999 before transferring to Carleton. He won the CIS National Championship with the Ravens in 2003, while earning First Team All-Canadian honours. He was a member of Team Canada at the 2003 World University Games in South Korea and played professionally for BBC Bayreuth in the German 2. Bundesliga in parts of the 2003-04 season. After returning to Canada, Smart pursued a PhD degree in management at Carleton University. His doctoral thesis was on "A Longitudinal Case Study of a Public-Sector Change Team".

Smart joined the coaching staff of the Carleton Ravens men's basketball as an assistant to Dave Smart in 2004. He won U Sports national championships as an assistant in 2005, 2006, 2007, 2009, 2011, 2012, 2013, 2014, 2015, 2017 and 2019. In the 2015-16 season, he served as interim head coach, guiding the Ravens to another national title, while being presented with the Pat O'Brien Award as Coach of the Year at Carleton. He returned to the assistant coach position for the 2016-17 season. Besides his coaching duties, Smart is a faculty member at Carleton's Sprott School of Business.
