= 2020 U Sports Men's Basketball Championship =

Canadian university basketball championship

- Season: 2019-20
- Teams: Eight
- Finals site: TD Place Arena; Ottawa, Ontario
- Champions: Carleton Ravens (15th title)
- Runner-up: Dalhousie Tigers

The 2020 U Sports Men's Basketball Championship was held March 6–8, 2020, in Ottawa, Ontario, to determine a national champion for the 2019–20 U Sports men's basketball season.

The Carleton Ravens won their 15th national title, and the gold medal, beating the Dalhousie Tigers in the championship game. The UBC Thunderbirds took the bronze medal over the Western Mustangs. This was the last college basketball championship event to be held in North America before the declaration of the COVID-19 pandemic; the 2020 NCAA Division I men's basketball tournament would be cancelled four days after Carleton won the tournament.

== Host ==
The tournament was jointly hosted by Carleton University, the University of Ottawa, and the Ottawa Sports & Entertainment Group (OSEG) at TD Place Arena. It was held in conjunction with the 2020 U Sports Women's Basketball Championship which occurred on the same weekend. This was the fifth time the city of Ottawa hosted the Men's championship game.

== Participating teams ==
Seed	Team	Qualified	Record
1	Carleton Ravens	OUA Champion	21–1
2	Dalhousie Tigers	AUS Champion	19–1
3	UBC Thunderbirds	Canada West Champion	16–4
4	Alberta Golden Bears	Canada West Finalist	19–1
5	Western Mustangs	OUA Finalist	16–6
6	Bishop's Gaiters	RSEQ Champion	8–8
7	Ottawa Gee-Gees	OUA Semifinalist (Host)	18–4
8	Calgary Dinos	Canada West Semifinalist (At-large berth)	18–2

== Championship Bracket ==
First Round: March 6
1	Carleton Ravens	82
8	Calgary Dinos	66
4	Alberta Golden Bears	72
5	Western Mustangs	86
2	Dalhousie Tigers	67
7	Ottawa Gee-Gees	63
3	UBC Thunderbirds	103
6	Bishop's Gaiters	66

Semi-Finals: March 7
1	Carleton Ravens	90
5	Western Mustangs	63
2	Dalhousie Tigers	84
3	UBC Thunderbirds	55

Final: March 8
1	Carleton Ravens	74
2	Dalhousie Tigers	65
Bronze Medal Game: March 8
3	UBC Thunderbirds	99
5	Western Mustangs	82

== Consolation Bracket ==
Semi-Finals: March 7
4	Alberta Golden Bears	71
8	Calgary Dinos	61
6	Bishop's Gaiters	75
7	Ottawa Gee-Gees	77

Fifth Place Game: March 8
4	Alberta Golden Bears	88
7	Ottawa Gee-Gees	75
