= Ryan Bell (basketball) =

Canadian basketball player

Personal information
- Born: April 17, 1984 (age 42)
- Listed height: 6 ft 4 in (1.93 m)

Career information
- High school: Colonel By
- College: Carleton
- Playing career: 2008–2010
- Position: Guard

Career history
- 2008–2009: Schalke 04
- 2009–2010: Espoon Honka

Ryan Bell (born April 17, 1984) is a retired Canadian basketball player from Orleans, Ontario (suburban Ottawa, Ontario). Bell lastly played as guard for Espoon Honka in Finland.

Bell has won four national championships as a member of Carleton University Ravens, winning in 2004, 2005, 2006 and 2007. He studied sociology at Carleton University. Before Carleton, he attended Colonel By Secondary School.

Bell joined the Canada national men's basketball team in 2006. He represented Canada at the 2007 Pan American Games and the FIBA Americas Championship 2007. Canada's team at the 2007 Pan American Games included his fellow Carleton teammates Osvaldo Jeanty and Aaron Doornekamp along with Assistant Coach Dave Smart.

Bell is a cousin of professional soccer player Jamar Dixon.
