= Ottawa BlackJacks =

Ottawa BlackJacks BlackJacks d'Ottawa
- 2026 CEBL season
- Leagues: CEBL
- Founded: 2019
- History: Ottawa BlackJacks (2019–present)
- Arena: TD Place Arena
- Capacity: 8,585
- Location: Ottawa, Ontario
- Team colours: Black, Grey, Red
- President: Jason Winters
- General manager: James Derouin
- Head coach: Justin Mazzulla
- Ownership: Diamond Sports Canada Inc.
- Website: theblackjacks.ca

The Ottawa BlackJacks (French: BlackJacks d'Ottawa) are a Canadian professional basketball team based in Ottawa, Ontario. The BlackJacks compete in the Canadian Elite Basketball League (CEBL). They play their home games at TD Place Arena, an arena shared with the Ottawa 67's of the Ontario Hockey League. Ottawa is led by head coach Justin Mazzulla.

== Background ==
The BlackJacks are the second professional basketball team in Ottawa; the Ottawa Skyhawks played at Canadian Tire Centre in 2012 to 2014.

== History ==
2020 Season

Dave Smart was named the inaugural General Manager of the Blackjacks on December 18, 2019.

2021 Season

On July 17, the BlackJacks signed former CEBL champion and NBA G-Leaguer Negus Webster-Chan after he was released by the Saskatchewan Rattlers. On July 19, guard Johnny Berhanemeskel was inactivated due to his contractual obligations with the French team Chorale Roanne Basket. On July 23, the BlackJacks signed three new players, Jadon Cohee, Mamadou Gueye, and Antonio Williams. Additionally, forward Eric Kibi was released after appearing in only one game. On July 27, the BlackJacks secured a playoff spot for the second straight season with an 82-69 win over the Saskatchewan Rattlers. In August, the BlackJacks signed former Saskatchewan Rattler center Chad Posthumus. In the playoffs, the Blackjacks upset the 3rd seeded Hamilton Honey Badgers 96-94 in the quarter-finals. However, they went on to lose to the eventual champion Edmonton Stingers in the semi-finals for the second straight year.

2022 Season

In August 2021, the BlackJacks announced Jevohn Shepherd had signed a contract extension to return as the general manager. In November, they announced that Charles Dubé-Brais would also return as head coach. On February 16, 2022, they re-signed Chad Posthumus, who had previously joined the Edmonton Stingers for the 2021–22 BCL Americas. After a disappointing 0-3 start to the season, the team parted ways with Head Coach Charles Dubé-Brais. Ottawa Gee-Gees Men's Basketball Head Coach and BlackJacks Director of Basketball Strategy and Analytics James Derouin was appointed Interim Head Coach and lead the team to five wins in its last six games.

2023 Season

Prior to the beginning of the season, the BlackJacks announced James Derouin would remain Head Coach of the team, removing the Interim title from his position. During the 2023 CEBL–U Sports Draft, Ottawa selected UBC Thunderbird Sukhman Sandhu and University of Ottawa star Guillaume Pepin. Former Washington State Cougars sharpshooter Michael Flowers and Toronto Raptors Summer League team member Abu Kigab were among the new signings joining the team. On July 15, in the midst of an 8-game win streak, the BlackJacks clinched an Eastern Conference playoff spot with a victory on the road against the Scarborough Shooting Stars. After finishing the regular season as the second seed in the Eastern Conference, the BlackJacks were eliminated from the playoffs by the Shooting Stars in the Conference Semi-Final.

2024 Season

In January 2024, the BlackJacks announced James Derouin would serve as both Head Coach and General Manager of the team for the 2024 Season. The BlackJacks selected a trio of U Sports players with ties to Ottawa during the 2024 CEBL Draft, adding guard Dragan Stajic and forward Justin Ndjock-Tadjoré from the Ottawa Gee-Gees and forward Michael Kelvin II of the Queen's Gaels. Notable signings include former Iowa Hawkeyes wing Peter Jok, former Chicago Bulls and Newfoundland Growlers guard Brandon Sampson, and Atlanta Hawks Summer League participant and Dayton Flyers standout Ibi Watson. The BlackJacks experienced significant roster turnover throughout the season, with season-ending injuries and players departing for other commitments, resulting in a CEBL-record 24 players suiting up for the club over the summer. Ottawa clinched a playoff berth following their win against Saskatchewan on July 25, and upset the reigning champion Scarborough in the Eastern Conference Play-In before falling to the Niagara River Lions in the Eastern Conference Semi-Final.

2025 Season

On May 23, 2025, the Montreal Alliance will host the Ottawa Blackjacks in a CEBL game outdoors at IGA Stadium. According to the league, "It will be the first professional five-on-five basketball game held outdoors in Canadian history."

== Players ==
=== Current roster ===
Note: Flags indicate national team eligibility at FIBA-sanctioned events. Players may hold other non-FIBA nationalities not displayed.

Ottawa BlackJacks roster
Players
Coaches

Pos.	No.	Nat.	Name	Ht.	Wt.	Age
F	24	(Canada)	Ndjock-Tadjoré, Justin	6 ft 7 in (2.01 m)	195 lb (88 kg)	25 – 2 April 2001
G	25	(Canada)	Epistola, Calvin	5 ft 10 in (1.78 m)	175 lb (79 kg)	30 – 29 September 1996
G	3	(Canada)	Stajic, Dragan	6 ft 2 in (1.88 m)	194 lb (88 kg)	25 – 12 December 2000

Head coach

- (Canada) James Derouin

Assistant coach(es)

- (Canada) Jamil Abiad
- (Canada) Damian Buckley
- (Canada) Dave DeAveiro
- (Canada) Mike L'Africain

Legend

- (C) Team captain
- (I) Inactive
- Injured

- Roster
- Transactions
Updated: January 1, 2026

== Honours ==
All CEBL Teams

CEBL First team All Stars

Season	Position	Player
2020	Forward	Thomas Scrubb
2021	Forward	Nick Ward
2026	Guard	Javonte Smart

CEBL Second team All Stars

Season	Position	Player
2023	Forward	Deng Adel
2023	Guard	Kadre Gray
2026	Forward/Guard	Matthew Cleveland

All Canadian Team

Season	Player	Hometown
2023	Jackson Rowe	Toronto
2023	Kadre Gray	Toronto

Individual Awards

Defensive Player of the Year

Season	Player
2024	Lloyd Pandi

Canadian Player of The Year

Season	Player	Hometown
2023	Kadre Gray	Toronto

U Sports Developmental Player of The Year

Season	Player	University Team
2020	Lloyd Pandi	University of Carleton Ravens

CEBL Clutch Player of The Year

Season	Player
2024	Tevin Brown

== Season-by-season record ==
League	Season	Coach	Regular season				Post season			
League	Season	Coach	Won	Lost	Win %	Finish	Won	Lost	Win %	Result
CEBL
CEBL	2020	Osvaldo Jeanty	3	3	.500	4th	1	1	.500	Lost semi-finals
CEBL	2021	Charles Dubé-Brais	4	10	.286	6th	1	1	.500	Lost semi-finals
CEBL	2022	James Derouin	8	12	.400	8th	0	1	.000	Lost semi-finals
CEBL	2023	James Derouin	12	8	.600	2nd East	0	1	.000	Lost Quarter-finals
CEBL	2024	James Derouin	9	11	.450	3rd East	1	1	.500	Lost Quarter-finals
CEBL	2025	David DeAveiro	12	12	.500	2nd East	0	1	.000	Lost Quarter-finals
CEBL	2026	Justin Mazzulla	10	14	.417	3rd East	0	1	.000	Lost Quarter-finals
Totals			58	70	.453	—	3	7	.300	
