= Thomas Scrubb =

Canadian basketball player

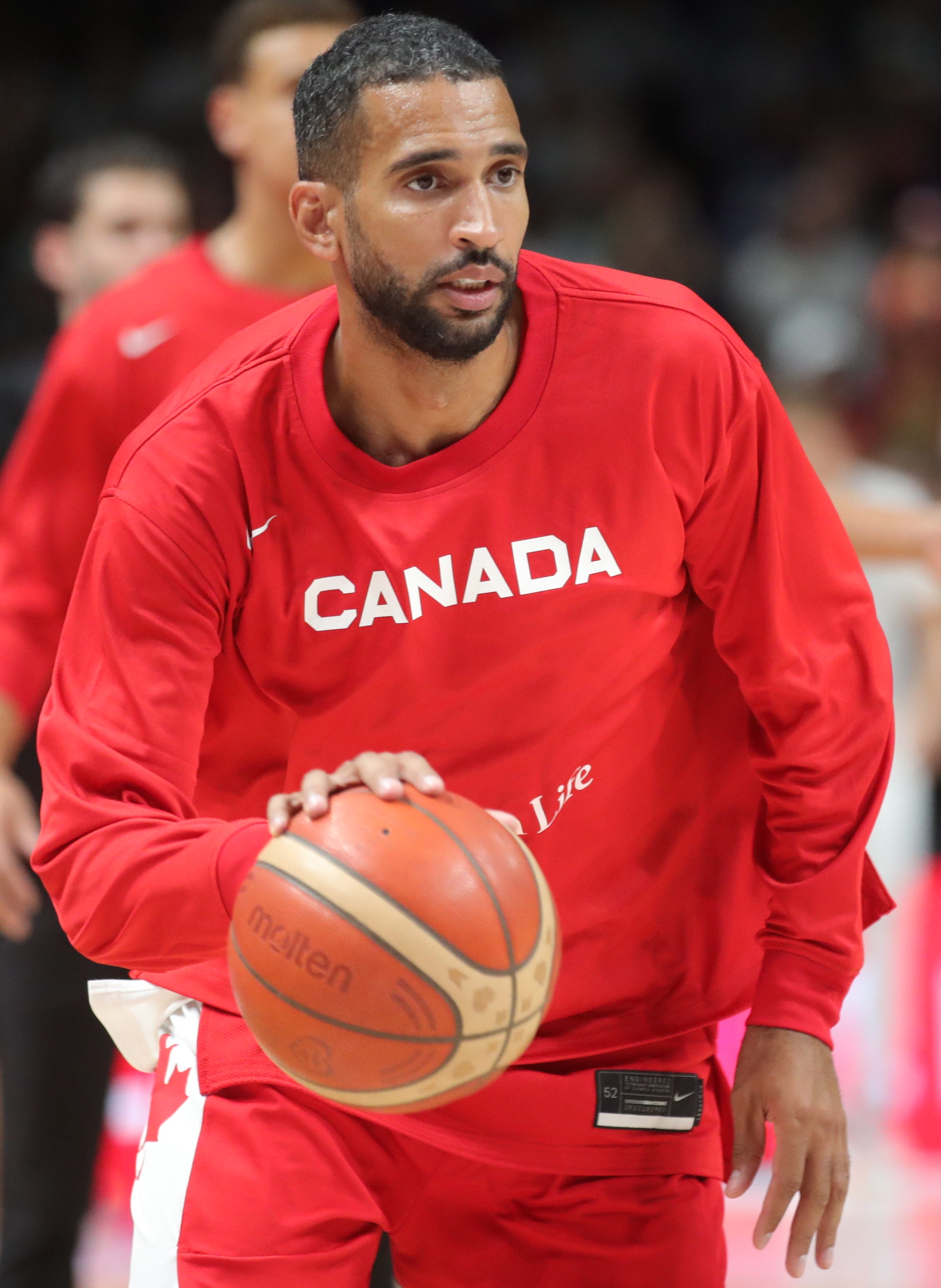
- Scrubb with Canada in 2023

Free Agent
- Position: Small forward

Personal information
- Born: September 26, 1991 (age 35) Richmond, British Columbia, Canada
- Listed height: 6 ft 6 in (1.98 m)
- Listed weight: 200 lb (91 kg)

Career information
- High school: Vancouver College (Vancouver, British Columbia)
- College: Carleton (2009–2015)
- NBA draft: 2013: undrafted
- Playing career: 2015–present

Career history
- 2015–2016: Kataja
- 2016–2017: Gießen 46ers
- 2017–2018: Scandone Avellino
- 2018–2019: Varese
- 2019–2020: SIG Strasbourg
- 2020: Ottawa BlackJacks
- 2020–2021: JL Bourg
- 2021–2022: Monbus Obradoiro
- 2022: Ottawa BlackJacks
- 2022–2024: Monbus Obradoiro
- 2024–2026: Tenerife

Career highlights
- 5× CIS champion (2011–2015); CIS Tournament MVP (2013); CIS First Team (2015); 2× CIS Defensive Player of the Year (2014, 2015)

Thomas Ryan Scrubb (born September 26, 1991) is a Canadian professional basketball player who last played for La Laguna Tenerife of the Spanish Liga ACB. He played university basketball for the Carleton Ravens.

== University career ==
After playing at Vancouver College high school, Scrubb enrolled at Carleton University in 2009, and sat out the 2009–10 season. Playing alongside his brother Philip Scrubb, he won five straight CIS National Championships with the Ravens. He took home the CIS Defensive Player of the Year distinction in 2014 and 2015, while also earning All-CIS First Team honours in 2015. In 2013, Scrubb was presented with the Jack Donohue Trophy, being the Most Valuable Player of the CIS Championship. He was also a three-time CIS Tournament All-Star Team selection (2013, 2014, 2015).

== Professional career ==
Scrubb kicked off his professional career with Kataja Basket, of the Finnish top-flight Korisliiga, in 2015. He also participated in the European-wide 4th-tier level FIBA Europe Cup with the club. Making a seamless transition to the professional game, he garnered eurobasket.com All-Korisliiga Forward of the Year and All-Korisliiga First Team honours as a rookie. He ended his Kataja stint at the completion of the 2015–16 campaign, and in May 2016, he signed a deal with the Gießen 46ers of the Basketball Bundesliga, the highest level basketball league in Germany.

In July 2017, Scrubb signed with S.S. Felice Scandone of Italy's top-flight league, the LBA.

On July 13, 2018, Scrubb signed with Pallacanestro Varese. He moved to French LNB Pro A outfit SIG Strasbourg in July 2019.

On June 11, 2020, Scrubb signed with the Ottawa Blackjacks of the Canadian Elite Basketball League (CEBL).

On July 21, 2020, Scrubb signed with JL Bourg in France. He averaged 8.2 points, 4.3 rebounds and 1.4 assists per game. On July 14, 2021, Scrubb signed with Monbus Obradoiro of the Liga ACB.

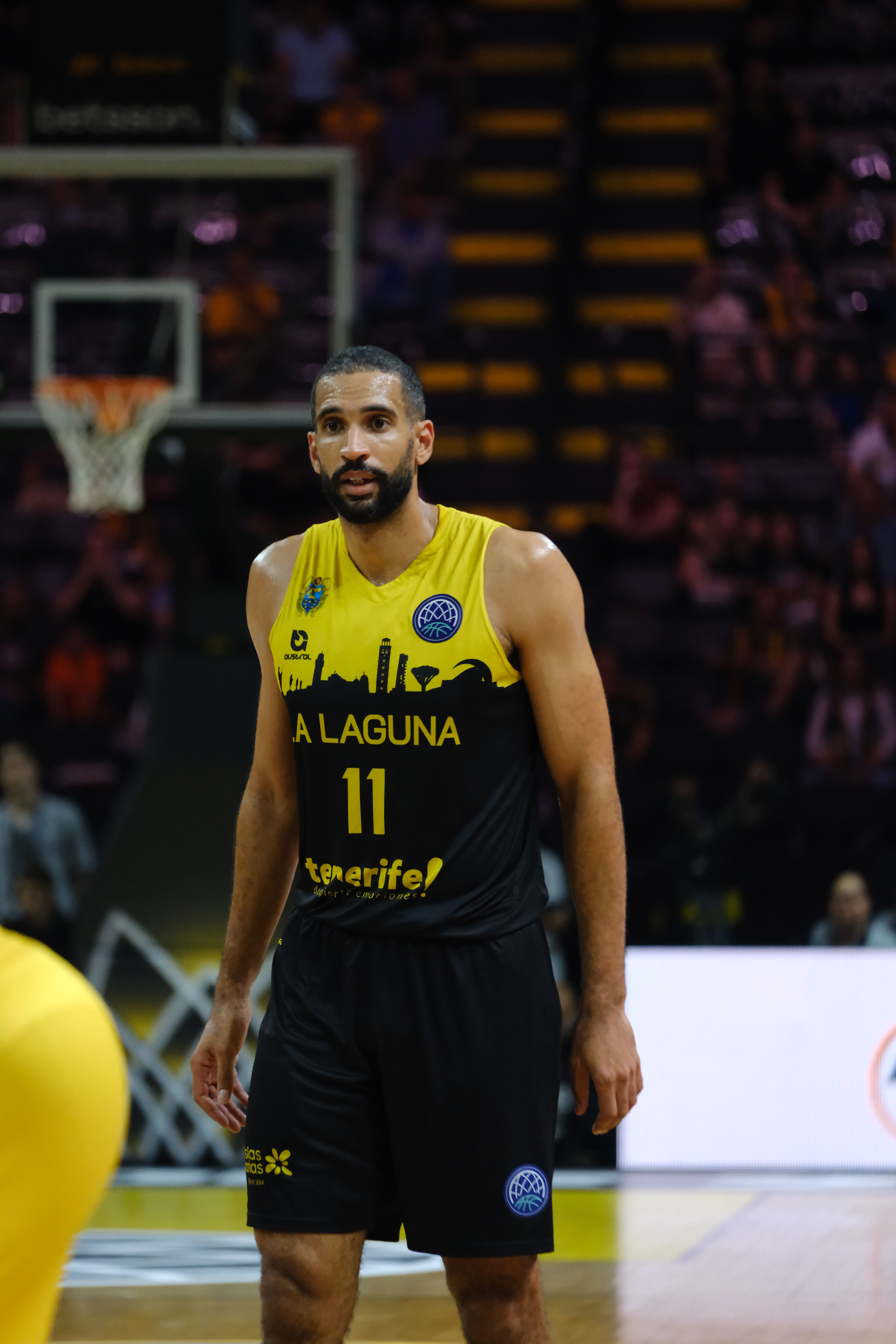
Scrubb with Canarias in 2025

On July 1, 2024, he signed with La Laguna Tenerife of the Spanish Liga ACB.

== National team career ==
At the 2011 World University Games, Scrubb reached the semifinals with Team Canada. In 2016, he played in the Olympic qualifying tournament with the senior Canadian men's national team, but they did not make it to the Rio games.

== Personal life ==
Scrubb's brother, Phil, is also a professional basketball player.

=== University statistics ===
Year	Team	GP	GS	MPG	FG%	3P%	FT%	RPG	APG	SPG	BPG	PPG
2010–11	Carleton	21	1	10.4	50.0	35.7	75.0	2.2	0.7	0.	0.2	3.0
2011–12	Carleton	22	0	23.5	49.2	55.1	59.4	1.1	3.5	1.0	0.3	9.7
2012–13	Carleton	20	19	30.4	47.1	32.5	68.8	7.3	2.9	1.1	0.6	12.2
2013–14	Carleton	22	20	28.6	50.0	42.1	91.7	8.4	2.5	0.7	0.4	13.2
2014–15	Carleton	19	18	26.5	55.7	50.0	72.7	7.6	3.6	0.7	0.4	17.2
Career		104	58	22.9	51.8	41.8	75.0	5.8	2.1	0.7	0.3	10.9
