= Connor Wood (basketball) =

Canadian basketball player

Personal information
- Born: May 29, 1993 (age 33) Guelph, Ontario
- Listed height: 6 ft 4 in (1.93 m)

Career information
- High school: Bishop Macdonell (Guelph, Ontario)
- College: Carleton (2012–2017)
- NBA draft: 2017: undrafted
- Playing career: 2017–present
- Position: Guard

Career history
- 2017–2018: Niagara River Lions
- 2018–2019: Paderborn Baskets
- 2019: UJAP Quimper
- 2019: Guelph Nighthawks
- 2019–2020: Rio Ourense

Career highlights
- 5× CIS champion (2013–2017); CIS Player of the Year (2017); CIS Tournament MVP (2016); CIS All-Canada First Team (2017); OUA Player of the Year (2017); All-OUA First Team (2017)

Connor John Wood (born May 29, 1993) is a Canadian professional basketball player. Wood plays the guard position.

== College career ==
During his college career, he won five straight CIS championships with the Carleton Ravens. Wood was the recipient of the Mike Moser Memorial Trophy as the CIS Outstanding Player in 2016–17 and also earned All-Canada First Team as well as OUA Player of the Year and CIS Tournament All-Star Team honours that year. As a fifth-year player, Wood averaged 19.2 points a game in 2016–17, while nailing 50.8 per cent of his shots from the floor and 50.3 percent from beyond the arc.

== Professional career ==
In November 2017, he signed his first contract as a professional basketball player, joining the Niagara River Lions of the National Basketball League of Canada (NBL Canada). He made 44 appearances for the River Lions in his rookie season, averaging 9.3 points, 2.9 rebounds and 2.1 assists per contest.

On July 30, 2018, Wood signed with Paderborn Baskets of the ProA, the second-tier league in Germany. He saw action in 28 ProA games during the 2018-19 campaign, averaging 12.7 points, 2.9 assists, 2.7 rebounds per contest. Draining 43.3% of his shots taken from beyond the arc (71-of-164), he was Paderborn's leading three-point shooter. Wood moved to UJAP Quimper of the French ProB in April 2019. He finished the 2018-19 season with the French second-division club, averaging 8.9 points and 1.9 rebounds per contest (seven games played). Later in 2019, he played for the Guelph Nighthawks in the Canadian Elite Basketball League (CEBL), scoring a team-high 16.1 points per game, while dishing out 3.7 assists a contest. He subsequently joined Rio Ourense of the Spanish second division LEB Oro for the 2019-20 season. He shot 45.9% on 133 threes in 24 games during the 2019-20 season, scoring 9.0 points per contest, along with 2,7 rebounds and 1.0 assist per game.

== National team career ==
He competed for Canada at the 2017 World University Games in Taiwan.

Posting 14 points, 2.3 rebounds and 2.2 assists a contest, Wood helped Team Canada capture the 2017 William Jones Cup title.
