= Robert W. Smart =

American artist (1973-)

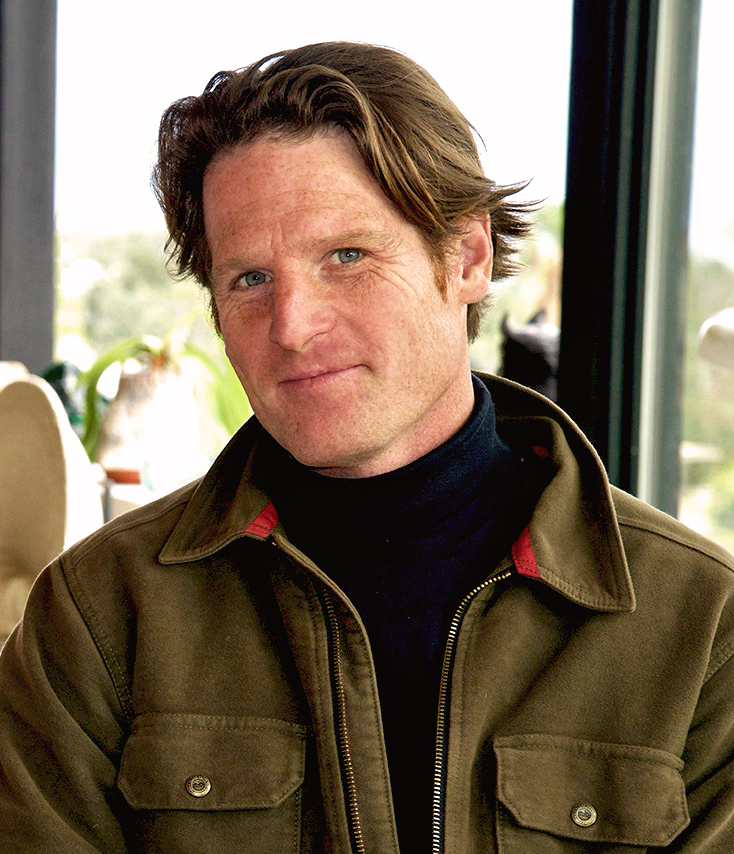
- Born: Robert William Smart; Milwaukee, Wisconsin, US
- Education: Lawrence University (BA), Boston University (MFA)
- Known for: Programmable lighting technologies, large-scale glass and steel sculptures
- Website: www.smartdesignstudios.com

Robert William Smart is an American artist who works with programmable lighting technologies. Primarily, his work consists of large-scale public art installations in metal and glass for various cities and universities. Smart has taught sculpture and drawing for various colleges and universities.

== Career ==
In 1999, Smart created an exhibition at the Boston Cyberarts Festival, which later became a permanent interactive computer installation entitled Time within the main lobby at the Boston University Photonics Center.

In 2007, Smart installed the corten steel public art sculpture entitled SS Core Sphere purchased by the city of Milwaukee, Wisconsin and is located on the Northwest end of downtown plaza Kilbourn Avenue Bridge.

In 2009, Smart was commissioned to create Emitting Waves, a public art piece installed at Fire Station #5 in Evanston, Illinois.

In 2000, Smart was invited to the village La Souterraine in central France to work at the Les Recontres Multicultural Arts Festival doing performance/sculpture in live cast mask making. In 2001, he went to an iron casting residency at the Franconia Sculpture Park in Shafer, Minnesota. He worked on the plaster casts made in France and turned them into cast iron through the sand casting process. This is an ongoing work that Smart has maintained since 2005.

In 2013, Smart built a 35’ x 10’ x 2’ programmable LED “breathing wall” and seven roll-formed illuminated benches for the Penfield Redevelopment Project, in Saint Paul, Minnesota.

In 2014, Smart installed a work entitled Ethos for the Sheridan Veterans Memorial at the Sheridan Memorial Park in Sheridan, Minneapolis. Smart integrated cast iron faces of several veterans and family members.

== See also ==
- List of American artists 1900 and after
- Lighting control system
- Photonics
