= 2014 CIS Men's Basketball Championship =

Canadian university basketball championship

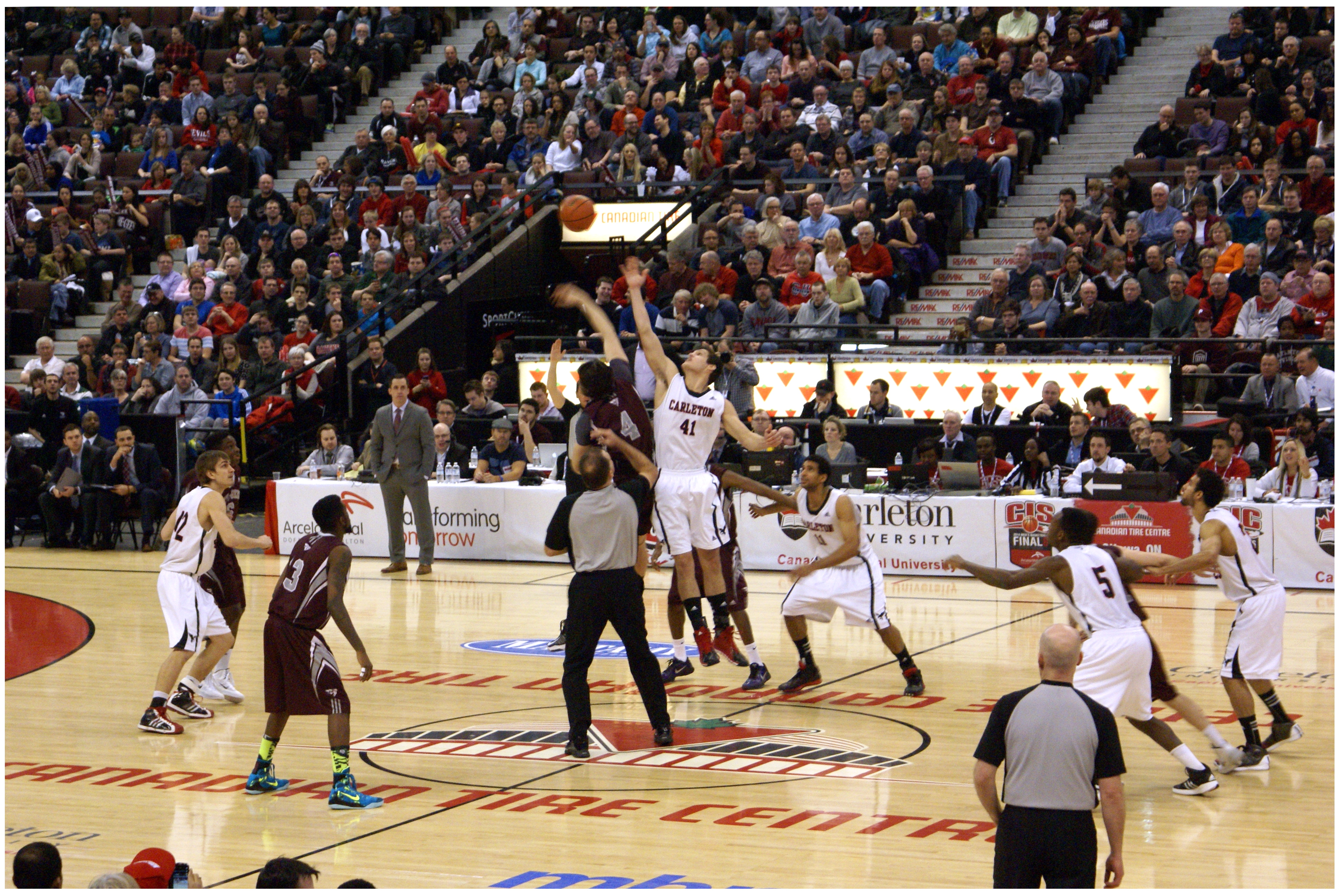
Ravens and Gee-Gees tipping off for the final game

The 2014 CIS Men's Final 8 Basketball Tournament was held March 7–9, 2014 in Ottawa, Ontario. Host and defending champion Carleton Ravens won the final against the Ottawa Gee-Gees. It was the second of two consecutive CIS Championships to be held at Canadian Tire Centre after the tournament was held in Halifax in 2011 and 2012. This was the fifth time Carleton University has hosted the tournament with the Carleton Ravens guaranteed a spot in the tournament as the host team.

== Participating teams ==
Seed	Team	Qualified
1	Ottawa Gee-Gees	Ontario University Champion
2	Carleton Ravens	Host (OUA Runner-Up)
3	Alberta Golden Bears	Canada West Champion
4	Victoria Vikes	Canada West Finalist
5	McGill Redmen	Quebec University Champion
6	Saint Mary's Huskies	Atlantic University Champion
7	McMaster Marauders	Ontario University 3rd place
8	Saskatchewan Huskies	Canada West Bronze Medalists

Defending champion Carleton Ravens won their division OUA East undefeated (22–0) but lost the Conference final one week before the tournament to the Ottawa Gee-Gees.

The Gee-Gees came second in the OUA East Division, losing only both regular season games to the Ravens (20–2), before claiming victory of the Wilson Cup in Toronto.

The Golden Bears won the Prairie Division with 20-2 wins and the Canada West Championship.

Victoria Vikes won the Pacific Division (19–3) and came second in the Canada West Championship.

McGill's Redmen won the regular season (14–2) and the Quebec University Championship against the Bishop's Gaiters.

SMU came second in the regular season with 14-6 wins but secured their spot in the Final 8 with their win in the AUS final against St. Francis' X-Men.

McMaster came 1st in the OUA West division (18–4). As their conference's 3rd, the Marauders advanced to the Final 8 because the host Ravens came 2nd in the same conference.

Saskatchewan came 2nd in the Prairie Division (15–7) and won the bronze medal in the Canada West Championship against the UFV Cascades.

== Championship Bracket ==
First Round: March 7
1	Ottawa Gee-Gees	94
8	Saskatchewan Huskies	73
4	Victoria Vikes	63
5	McGill Redmen	54
2	Carleton Ravens	82
7	McMaster Marauders	64
3	Alberta Golden Bears	72
6	Saint Mary's Huskies	62

Semi-Finals: March 8
1	Ottawa Gee-Gees	78
4	Victoria Vikes	70
2	Carleton Ravens	79
3	Alberta Golden Bears	55

Final: March 9
1	Ottawa Gee-Gees	67
2	Carleton Ravens	79
