= 2007 CIS Men's Basketball Championship =

Canadian university basketball championship

The 2007 CIS Men's Final 8 Basketball Tournament was held from March 16–18, 2007, at the Halifax Metro Centre in Halifax, Nova Scotia. This marked the final time the tournament was hosted at this venue.

The Carleton Ravens secured their fifth consecutive national title.

== Bracket ==
Elite Eight
1	Concordia Stingers	62
8	Saint Mary's Huskies	63
4	Brandon Bobcats	81
5	Windsor Lancers	64
2	UBC Thunderbirds	85
7	Ottawa Gee Gees	92
3	Carleton Ravens	86
6	Acadia Axemen	38

Semi-finals
4	Brandon Bobcats	79
8	Saint Mary's Huskies	74
3	Carleton Ravens	79
7	Ottawa Gee Gees	58

National Championship
3	Carleton Ravens	52
4	Brandon Bobcats	49

== Tournament Awards ==
- MVP: Aaron Doornekamp, Carleton
- All-stars:
  - Osvaldo Jeanty, Carleton
  - Dany Charlery, Brandon
  - David Yul Michel, Brandon
  - Josh Gibson-Bascombe, Ottawa
  - Mark McLaughlin, Saint Mary's
