= Stuart Turnbull (basketball) =

Canadian basketball player

Stuart Thomas "Stu" Turnbull (born December 28, 1984, in Kingston, Ontario) is a former Canadian professional basketball player.

== Career ==
A product of Frontenac Secondary School, Turnbull played for the Carleton Ravens men's basketball program from 2004 to 2009, winning CIS National Championship titles in 2005, 2006, 2007 and 2009. In the 2008-09 campaign, Turnbull was presented with the Jack Donohue Trophy as Championship Tournament MVP. He also was named to the All-Canada First Team and received OUA East Player of the Year and OUA Wilson Cup MVP honours that year. He made headlines after hitting the game-winning buzzer-beater in the 2009 CIS semi-final.

Following graduation in 2009, Turnbull played three years of professional basketball in Germany. After a brief stint with the Giants Nördlingen of the German ProA league at the beginning of the 2009-10 season, he signed with SC Rist Wedel of the German ProB and quickly became a team leader. For the 2010-11 season, he returned to the German ProA league, joining the UBC Hannover Tigers. At Hannover, he averaged 15.4 points, 4.0 rebounds and 2.8 assists per contest. Turnbull spent his last season as a professional basketball player with the Dragons Rhöndorf in the German ProB league. In each season in Germany, Turnbull was named to the Eurobasket.com All-Defensive Team of the respective league. He returned to his native Canada, where he ran summer basketball camps for youth players and started working in digital marketing.
