= Osvaldo Jeanty =

Canadian basketball player and coach (born 1983)

Personal information
- Born: August 1, 1983 (age 43) Belle-Rivière, Haiti
- Listed height: 6 ft 0 in (1.83 m)

Career information
- High school: Samuel-Genest (Ottawa)
- College: Carleton (2002–2007)
- NBA draft: 2006: undrafted
- Playing career: 2007–2025
- Position: Guard
- Number: 8

Career history
- 2007–2009: Giants Nördlingen
- 2009–2010: CS Gaz Metan Mediaș
- 2010: Gießen 46ers
- 2010–2012: Medi Bayreuth
- 2012: London Lightning
- 2025: Mitteldeutscher BC
- 2025: Air North Jets YT

Career highlights
- German ProA champion (2008); Eurobasket.com ProA First Team (2008); 5× CIS Champion (2003–2007); CIS Final Ten's MVP (2006); CIS All-Star (2006); 2× First-team All-Canadian (2006, 2007); 2× Second-team All-Canadian (2006, 2007); CIS Male Athlete of the Year (2005); Lois and Doug Mitchell Award Winner (2006); Lights Out Basketball Tournament Champion and 2nd Runner Up MVP - Whitehorse YT (2025)

Osvaldo Jeanty (born August 1, 1983) is a Canadian basketball coach and former professional basketball player.

He is one of the all-time greats of the Carleton University Ravens men's basketball team and a member of the Ravens' Hall of Fame. Jeanty was named CIS male athlete of the year in 2006, and CIS basketball player of the year in 2006 and 2007. He also played on Canada's men's national team.

Upon graduation, he spent six years playing professionally in Germany, Morocco, Romania and in the NBL Canada. He retired from professional basketball in November 2013.

== University career ==
Born in Belle-Rivière, Haiti, Jeanty attended Carleton University majoring in commerce. In 2006, he was named the 2006 CIS male athlete of the year, by the Borden Ladner Gervais awards committee, becoming the first of two Carleton Raven student-athletes to do so in its twenty-one year history. Jeanty won Canadian Interuniversity Sport (CIS) titles every year while at Carleton, and was the MVP in four of those five championship games. During the 2005–06 season, he led the Carleton Ravens men's basketball team to their fourth straight CIS national basketball championship while leading the Ravens in scoring with a total of 326 points, which equates to an average of 14.8 points per game. In addition to being selected to the CIS All-star team during the 2005–06 season, Jeanty was also named the CIS `final 10` tournament MVP thus earning himself every MVP opportunity he could have that season.

== Professional play ==
Jeanty began playing internationally in the 2007–08 season playing for the Giants Nördlingen in Germany. He contributed to the success of the team that season, and helped them reach the first place in the ProA championship and therefore gaining the team a spot in the Basketball Bundesliga (BBL), Germany's top-tier league, while receiving ProA First team honors by eurobasket.com. He signed a contract extension with the Giants in June 2008 and would average 13.3 points, 2.6 rebounds and 1.8 assists in 32 BBL contests during the 2008-09 BBL campaign.

For the 2009–10 season, Jeanty started in Morocco, then returned to Nördlingen for a short stint, before signing with CS Gaz Metan Medias in Romania. In January he returned to the BBL to join the Giessen 46ers team where he stayed for the rest of the season. Throughout the 2009–10 season, Jeanty averaged 13.1 points, 2.3 rebounds all while shooting 40.7% of his three-point shot attempts.

For the 2010–11 season, Jeanty remained in the German BBL, signing with BBC Bayreuth on a one-year contract which was later extended to 2012. In November 2012, Jeanty left the German league to play with the London Lightning in the National Basketball league of Canada. Jeanty would only spend half a season with the Lightning, averaging 4.5 points, 1.6 rebounds and 1.1 assists. Jeanty returned to Germany to play with BBL side Mitteldeutscher Basketball club and as a member of the team, averaged 7.5 points per game in the 2012–2013 season.

He announced his retirement from professional basketball in November 2013. On October 16, 2014, Jeanty was inducted into the Carleton University Ravens Hall of Fame.

=== International play ===
He played for Canada's national men's basketball team on a European tour in the summer of 2006 and ended up in seventh place with Team Canada at the 2007 Pan American Games in Rio de Janeiro, Brazil.

== Post-playing career ==
Following his playing career, Jeanty worked for a company in Ottawa, offering full service brokerage services. He also remained close to the sport of basketball: Jeanty and his former Carleton teammate Willy Manigat run the Premier Hoops Academy.

Jeanty served as head coach of Cégep de l’Outaouais' basketball team between 2014 and 2016 and then joined the coaching staff of the Carleton University men's basketball team as an assistant to Dave Smart from 2016 to 2019. In 2020, he was named as the head coach of the CEBL's Ottawa Blackjacks. His contract expired following the 2020 season. Jeanty became a Financial planner for the Royal Bank of Canada.

== Personal life ==
Jeanty resides in Gatineau, Quebec.
