= Giants Nördlingen =

- Leagues: ProB
- Founded: 1953; 72 years ago
- History: TSV Nördlingen (1953–2007); VPV Giants Nördlingen (2007–2008); Giants TSV 1861 Nördlingen (2008–present)
- Arena: Hermann-Kessler Halle
- Capacity: 3,000
- Location: Nördlingen, Germany
- Team colors: Blue, White
- Championships: 1 German Second Division
- Website: noerdlinger-basketball.de

TSV 1861 Giants Nördlingen is a basketball club based in Nördlingen, Germany. The club currently plays in the ProB, the German third highest league.

== History ==
The club was founded as TSV Nördlingen in 1953. In the 1972/73 season TSV 1861 Nördlingen competed for first time in the southern group of the Basketball Bundesliga. After finishing bottom of the table (5/23 record) the club was relegated.
In the 2007/08 season, under the coach Andreas Wagner, Nördlingen managed to win the championship to the Bundesliga ProA and earned promotion to the Basketball Bundesliga.

In the spring of 2008, the club was renamed to Giants Nördlingen Basketball AG.

== Results ==
Season	Tier	League	Pos.	Postseason
2007–08	2	2. BBL	1	Promoted
2008–09	1	Bundesliga	16	Relegated
2009–10	2	2. BBL	16	–
2010–11	4	1. Regionalliga	1	Promoted
2011–12	3	Pro B	2	–
2012–13	3	Pro B	4	–

== Honours ==
- 2. Basketball Bundesliga (1):

2007–08

== Notable players ==
Note: Flags indicate national team eligibility at FIBA-sanctioned events. Players may hold other non-FIBA nationalities not displayed.

Criteria

To appear in this section a player must have either:

- Set a club record or won an individual award while at the club
- Played at least one official international match for their national team at any time
- Played at least one official NBA match at any time.

- (Canada) Osvaldo Jeanty
- (United States) Danny Gibson
- (United States) Lodrick Stewart
- (United States) Monta McGhee
- (United States) (Romania) Giordan Watson
