= UQAM Citadins =

Université du Québec à Montréal athletic teams

Université du Québec à Montréal Citadins
- University: Université du Québec à Montréal
- Association: U Sports
- Conference: RSEQ
- Location: Montreal, Quebec
- Nickname: Citadins
- Colours: Dark Blue and Light Blue
- Website: citadins.uqam.ca

The UQAM Citadins (French: Citadins de l'UQÀM) are the athletic teams that represent the Université du Québec à Montréal in Montreal, Quebec and currently compete in the RSEQ conference of U Sports. The Citadins field varsity teams in badminton, basketball, cheerleading, cross country, soccer, volleyball and flag-football.
