= 2011 CIS Men's Basketball Championship =

Canadian university basketball championship

The 2011 CIS Men's Final 8 Basketball Tournament was held March 11–13, 2011. It was the first of two consecutive CIS Championships to be held at the Halifax Metro Centre. The tournament was previously held 24 consecutive years in Halifax before being moved to Ottawa for three years. The defending champions are the University of Saskatchewan Huskies, who return to the tournament, along with six other qualifiers and one wild card.

The Carleton Ravens won their 7th tournament in nine years with an 82–59 victory over the Trinity Western Spartans in the final. It was also Carleton's 7th title over-all. This was the Spartans' first appearance in the Final 8.

The tournament was broadcast on TSN2. For the second year in a row there was controversy over tape delay of the tournaments, with both semi-finals and the championship game being shown after they had been played.

== List of participating teams ==
Seed	Team	Qualified
1	UBC Thunderbirds	Canada West Champions
2	Carleton Ravens	Ontario University Finalists
3	Saskatchewan Huskies	Canada West Finalists
4	Lakehead Thunderwolves	Ontario University Champions
5	Trinity Western Spartans	Wildcard
6	Dalhousie Tigers	Atlantic University Champions
7	Concordia Stingers	Quebec University Champions
8	Acadia Axemen	Atlantic University Finalists

== Championship Bracket ==
First Round: March 11
1	UBC Thunderbirds	96
8	Acadia Axemen	77
4	Lakehead Thunderwolves	74
5	Trinity Western Spartans	82
2	Carleton Ravens	73
7	Concordia Stingers	66
3	Saskatchewan Huskies	91
6	Dalhousie Tigers	79

Semi-Finals: March 12
1	UBC Thunderbirds	72
5	Trinity Western Spartans	74
2	Carleton Ravens	95
3	Saskatchewan Huskies	83

Final: March 13
2	Carleton Ravens	82
5	Trinity Western Spartans	59
Bronze Medal Game: March 13
1	UBC Thunderbirds	111
3	Saskatchewan Huskies	95

== Consolation Bracket ==
Consolation Semi-Finals: March 12
4	Lakehead Thunderwolves	75
8	Acadia Axemen	67
6	Dalhousie Tigers	76
7	Concordia Stingers	65

Consolation Final: March 13
4	Lakehead Thunderwolves	84
6	Dalhousie Tigers	80

Note: All records are against CIS competition only.

== Game Reports ==
- UBC 96-77 Acadia
- Trinity Western 82-74 Lakehead
- Saskatchewan 91-79 Dalhousie
- Carleton 73-66 Concordia
- Lakehead 75-67 Acadia
- Dalhouse 76-65 Concordia
- Trinity Western 74-72 UBC
- Carleton 95-83 Saskatchewan
- Lakehead 84-80 Dalhousie
- UBC 111-95 Saskatchewan
