= Aaron Doornekamp =

Canadian-Dutch basketball player

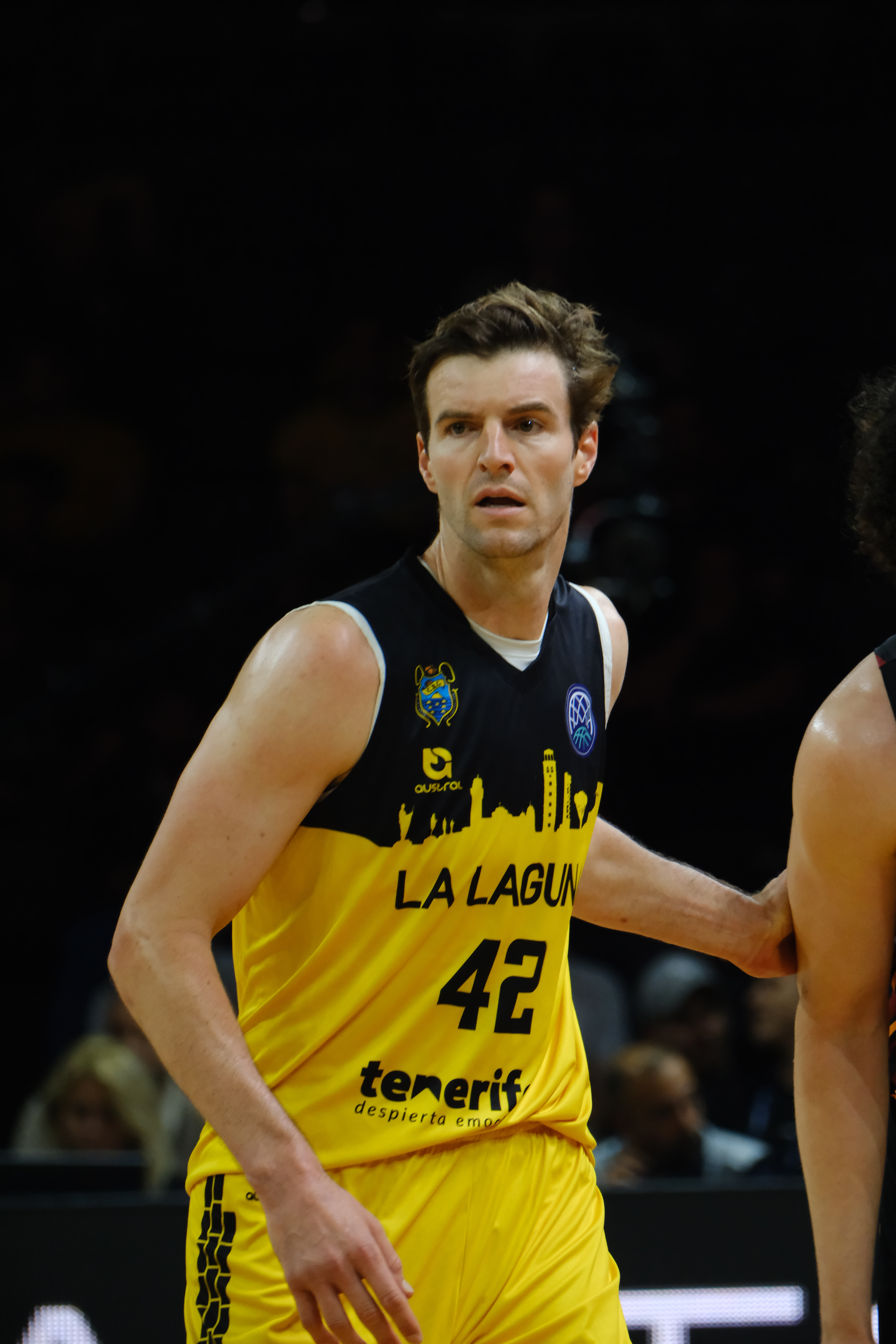
- Doornekamp with Tenerife in 2025

No. 42 – La Laguna Tenerife
- Position: Power forward / small forward
- League: Liga ACB

Personal information
- Born: December 5, 1985 (age 40) Napanee, Ontario, Canada
- Listed height: 2.01 m (6 ft 7 in)
- Listed weight: 96 kg (212 lb)

Career information
- High school: Ernestown Secondary (Odessa, Ontario)
- College: Carleton (2004–2009)
- NBA draft: 2009: undrafted
- Playing career: 2009–present

Career history
- 2009–2012: Pepsi Caserta
- 2013–2014: Braunschweig
- 2014–2016: Skyliners Frankfurt
- 2016–2017: Tenerife
- 2017–2020: Valencia Basket
- 2020–present: La Laguna Tenerife

Career highlights
- EuroCup champion (2019); 2× Champions League champion (2017, 2022); All-FIBA Champions League First Team (2017); FIBA Intercontinental Cup champion (2023); FIBA Europe Cup champion (2016); Spanish Supercup winner (2017)
Medals
Men's basketball
Representing Canada
FIBA AmeriCup
Bronze medal – third place	2015 Mexico City
Pan American Games
Silver medal – second place	2015 Toronto
FIBA U21 World Cup
Bronze medal – third place	2005 Mar del Plata

Aaron Rene Doornekamp (born December 5, 1985) is a Canadian-Dutch professional basketball player and the team captain for La Laguna Tenerife of the Liga ACB and the EuroCup. He was one of the greatest players in the history of the Carleton University Ravens men's college basketball team. Doornekamp is also a member of the senior Canadian men's national team. At a height of 2.01 m (6 ft 7 in) tall, he can play at both the small forward and power forward positions, with power forward being his main position.

== University career ==
Doornekamp was named CIS Men's Basketball Player of the year, and OUA Male Athlete of the Year, in 2008. He was a member of the Carleton Ravens Canadian national championship teams in 2005, 2006, 2007, and 2009, and he won the MVP award at the 2007 final eight tournament.

== Professional career ==
After finishing his college career, Doornekamp signed his first pro contract in Italy, with Pepsi Caserta. He played three years with the club. While sidelined with injury in the 2012–13 season, Doornekamp was the assistant coach of the McMaster Marauders men's basketball team.

In August 2013, he signed with the New Yorker Phantoms Braunschweig, from Braunschweig, Germany. In June 2014, he parted ways with them.

On June 29, 2014, he signed with the German club Skyliners Frankfurt, for the 2014–15 season. He won the European-wide third-tier level FIBA Europe Cup's 2015–16 season championship with the team.

In June 2016, Doornekamp left Germany, to sign with the Spanish team Tenerife. He won the Basketball Champions League's 2016–17 season championship with the team. He was also named to the BCL Star Lineup Best Team. On June 27, 2017, Doornekamp officially opted out of his contract with the Spanish team. The same day, he signed a two-year contract with Valencia Basket. On July 8, 2019, Doornekamp re-signed with Valencia Basket for another season. He signed with Tenerife on July 15, 2020.

== National team career ==
Doornekamp was a member of the junior national teams of Canada. With Canada's junior national team, he played at the 2005 FIBA Under-21 World Championship, where he won a bronze medal. He has also been a member of the senior men's Canadian national basketball team.

With Canada's senior team, he played at the following tournaments: the 2007 Pan American Games, the 2008 FIBA Olympic Qualifying Tournament, the 2009 FIBA Americas Championship, the 2010 FIBA World Championship, the 2011 FIBA Americas Championship, the 2013 FIBA Americas Championship, and the 2020 FIBA Olympic Qualifying Tournament. He also played at the 2015 Pan American Games, where he won a silver medal, and the 2015 FIBA Americas Championship, where he won a bronze medal. In the semifinals of the 2015 FIBA Americas Championship, which also served as the qualifying tournament for the 2016 Summer Olympics, Doornekamp had a controversial loose-ball foul called on him in the last second of Canada's game against Venezuela, giving Venezuela free throws to win the game 79-78 and qualify for the Olympics, while Canada would ultimately fail to qualify.

== Career statistics ==
Legend
GP	Games played	GS	Games started	MPG	Minutes per game
FG%	Field-goal percentage	3P%	3-point field-goal percentage	FT%	Free-throw percentage
RPG	Rebounds per game	APG	Assists per game	SPG	Steals per game
BPG	Blocks per game	PPG	Points per game	PIR	Performance index rating
**Bold**	Career high

=== EuroLeague ===
*	Led the league

Year	Team	GP	GS	MPG	FG%	3P%	FT%	RPG	APG	SPG	BPG	PPG	PIR
2017–18	Valencia	**30**	**18**	**22.2**	.344	.330	**.804**	**3.8**	**1.5**	**.8**	**.3**	**5.9**	**7.7**
2019–20	Valencia	28*	13	16.2	**.435**	**.405**	.688	2.3	.9	.4	.1	4.9	4.9
Career		58	31	19.3	.381	.363	.774	3.1	1.2	.6	.2	5.4	6.3

== Personal ==
Doornekamp was married on July 13, 2013, in Burlington, Ontario, to Jasmyn Richardson. The couple has three children.
