= Carleton Ravens =

Athletic teams of Carleton University in Ottawa

- University: Carleton University
- Nickname: Ravens
- Association: U Sports
- Conference: Ontario University Athletics
- Athletic director: Yolana Junco
- Location: Ottawa, Ontario
- Varsity teams: 15
- Football stadium: TAAG Park
- Basketball arena: Ravens' Nest
- Ice hockey arena: Carleton Ice House
- Soccer stadium: TAAG Park
- Colours: Black, White, and Red
- Mascot: Rodney the Raven
- Website: goravens.ca
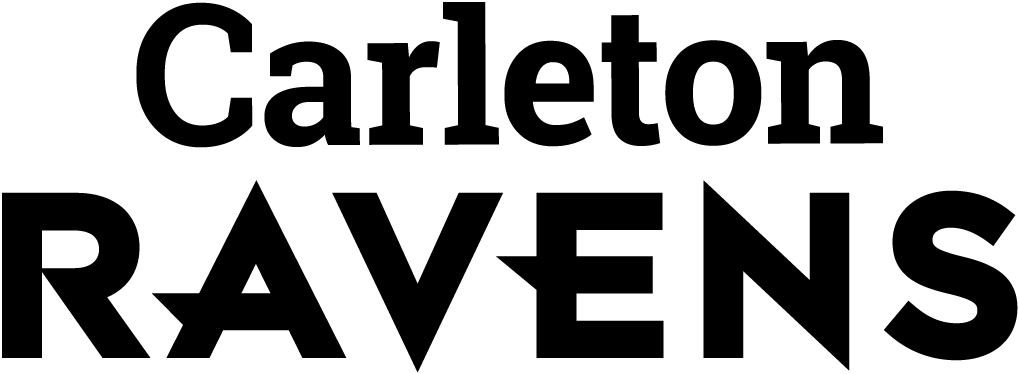

The Carleton Ravens are the athletic teams that represent Carleton University in Ottawa, Ontario. The most notable sports team for Carleton is the men's basketball team. In men's basketball, the Ravens have won 18 of the last 24 national men's championships, which is more than any top division college in Canada or the United States. The Ravens went on an 87-game winning streak from 2003 to 2006. They also had a 54-game home winning streak. The Ravens finished 2nd in the World University Basketball Championships in 2004.

Outside basketball, Ravens hockey players won a silver medal at the 2015 Winter Universiade in Granada. They are also the Men's Water Polo and Men's Fencing provincial champions. The Men's Hockey team also placed 3rd in the province and made an appearance at nationals. Carleton participates in the Ontario University Athletics (OUA) Conference for all varsity sports, except the Women's Hockey and Rugby teams who play in Quebec Student Sport Federation (RSEQ).

== Varsity sports ==
Men's sports	Women's sports
Basketball	Basketball
Fencing	Fencing
Football	Golf
Golf	Ice hockey
Ice hockey	Nordic skiing
Nordic skiing	Rowing
Rowing	Rugby
Soccer	Soccer

=== Men's basketball ===
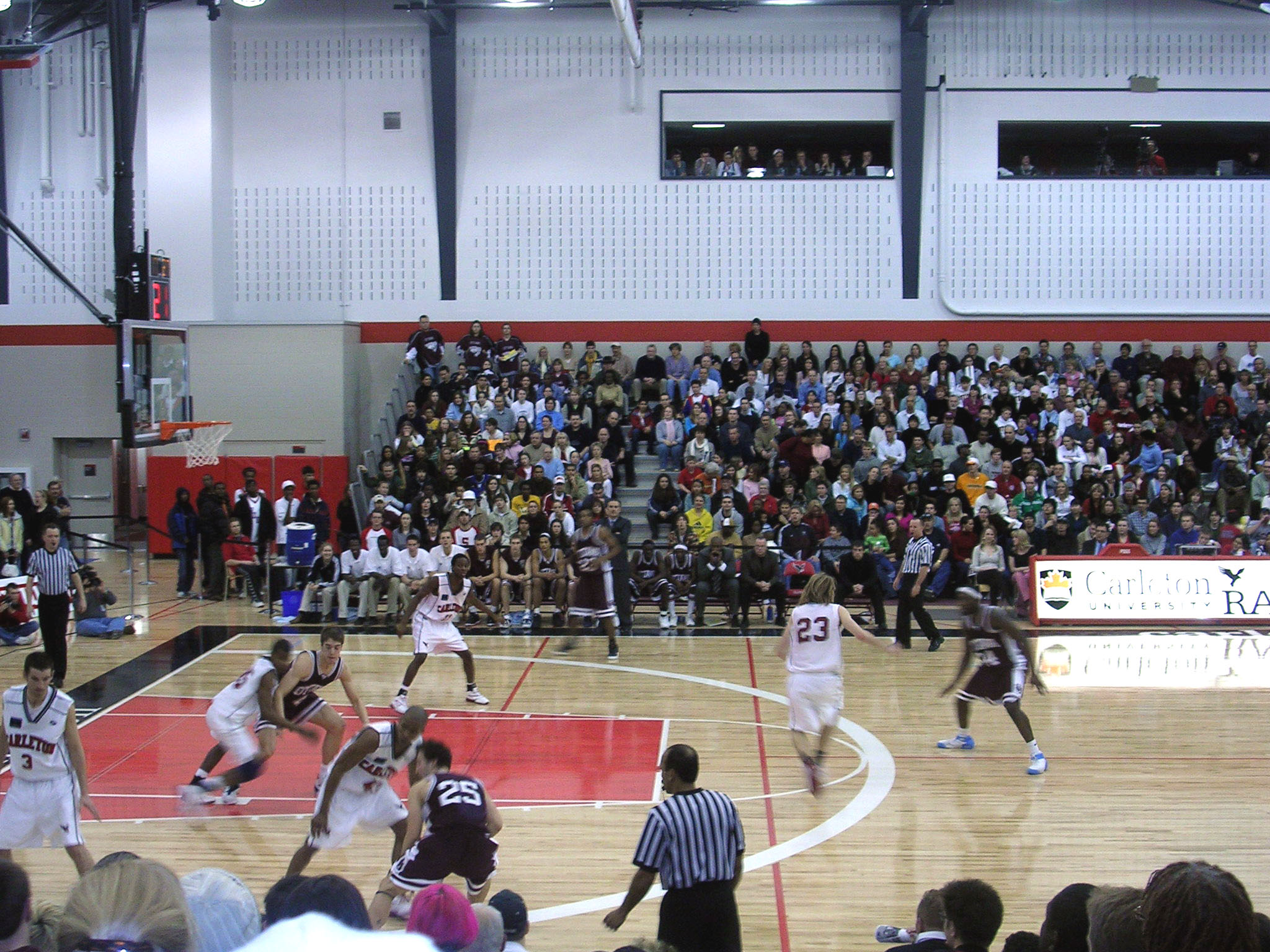
Men's basketball game between Carleton and uOttawa

The Ravens have won 18 of the last 23 national championships (2003 to 2007, 2009, 2011 to 2017, 2019, 2020, 2022, 2023 and 2026). Below is their regular season record since 1996–97. Of note, they have captured the Wilson Cup 12 times. Five of those national titles were won consecutively between 2002–03 and 2006–07 plus seven consecutive titles between 2010–2011 and 2016–2017, surpassing the University of Victoria at the top of the all-time list. The Vikes had seven consecutive wins in the 1980s. With its 12th crown in 2016, the Ravens eclipsed the UCLA Bruins men's basketball team as the college with the most national basketball titles, a feat accomplished in 14 years, compared with UCLA's 11 titles in 32 seasons.

As part of its athletic rivalry with the University of Ottawa, the team has participated in Capital Hoops Classic since its inception in 2007, which typically takes place in late January and early February at the arena at TD Place. In fourteen years of the event, Carleton has won on eleven occasions.

=== Women's basketball ===
Carleton's women's basketball program has become one of the most competitive in Canada, winning their first national championship in 2018. They won a second national title in 2023, and a third in 2024. The Ravens have also won the OUA Critelli Cup conference championship three times, in 2017, 2018, and 2023. Between 2009 and 2018, the Ruth Coe Award, recognizing Carleton University’s Female Athlete of the Year, was won by seven female basketball players. Additionally, the program served as host team for the 2020 U Sports Women's Basketball Championship, contested at Ottawa's TD Place Arena.

=== Curling ===
Carleton won the national women's championship in 2014 and the national men's championship in 2019. In 2025 Carleton won the men's provincial championship and captured the silver medal at the national championship.

=== Fencing ===
The Carleton fencing team competes on the Ontario University Athletics circuit and has won four women's championships and six men's championships. The most recent women's championship came in 2013, while the most recent men's championship came in 2015. The team's head coach is Kyle Girard.

Women's results
Season	Place
2011–12	1st
2012–13	1st
2013–14	2nd
2014–15	3rd
2015–16	6th
2016–17	5th
2017–18	6th
2018–19	4th
2019–20	9th
2020–21	N/A
2021–22	7th
2022–23	4th
2023–24	3rd

Men's results
Season	Place
2013–14	1st
2014–15	1st
2015–16	2nd
2016–17	2nd
2017–18	3rd
2018–19	2nd
2019–20	7th
2020–21	N/A
2021–22	9th
2022–23	11th
2023–24	11th

=== Women's field hockey ===
Season	W	L	T	PF	PA	Pts.	Finish
2002	2	9	1	14	32	7	3rd, OUA East
2003	1	12	1	3	66	4	7th, OUA
2004	3	8	3	12	38	12	7th, OUA
2005	5	8	1	9	23	16	6th, OUA
2006	2	10	2	18	42	8	7th, OUA
2007	3	10	1	6	55	10	6th, OUA
2008	2	9	3	4	49	9	7th, OUA
2009	0	14	0	7	57	0	8th, OUA
2010	0	14	0	6	82	0	8th, OUA

The women's field hockey team has not participated in U Sports since 2010.

=== Football ===
The Carleton Ravens football team returned to the Ontario University Athletics football conference in 2013 after a 15-year absence. Upon their return, the team was led by head coach Steve Sumarah from 2013 to 2021. In 2013, Sumarah predicted his team would play in the semi-finals within four years, and in 2016 the team accomplished that goal. After Sumarah was dismissed with a losing record over eight seasons, Corey Grant was hired as the team's head coach for the 2022 season. The football team plays at Keith Harris Stadium.

Historically, the Ravens football team first began play just after the Second World War in 1945 and was in continuous operation until the program was dropped in 1998. While the team had some success in the mid-1980s, poor performances and a plan by the Carleton Athletic department to invest more funds in other sports led to the sport being cut after the 1998 season. In their history, the Ravens won one Dunsmore Cup conference championship in 1985, but lost in the following Western Bowl to the Calgary Dinos 56 to 14.

=== Men's golf ===
Men's golf has had a long history at Carleton. Despite many strong individual performances, the Ravens have struggled to find team success at the OUA stage.

Season	Finish	Location	Host
2007	12th	Royal Ottawa Golf Club	University of Ottawa Gee-Gee's
2008	7th	Crosswinds Golf Club	McMaster University Marauders
2009	10th	Angus Glen Golf Club - South	University of Toronto Varsity Blues
2010	11th	Angus Glen Golf Club - South	University of Toronto Varsity Blues
2011	13th	Cataraqui Golf and Country Club	Queen's University Gaels
2012	13th	Grey Silo Golf Club	University of Waterloo Warriors
2013	14th	Grey Silo Golf Club	Wilfrid Laurier University Golden Hawks

=== Men's ice hockey ===
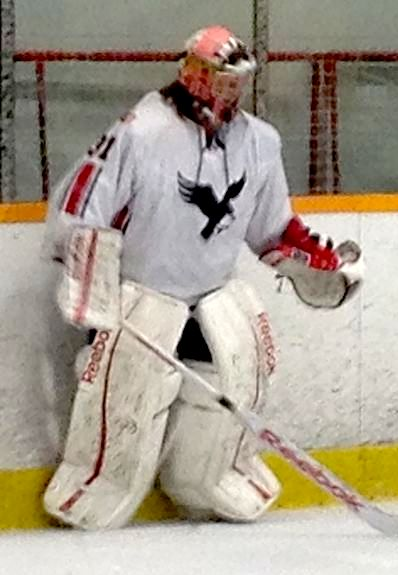
Carleton goaltender Francis Dupuis during 2013-14 season vs. Windsor Lancers.

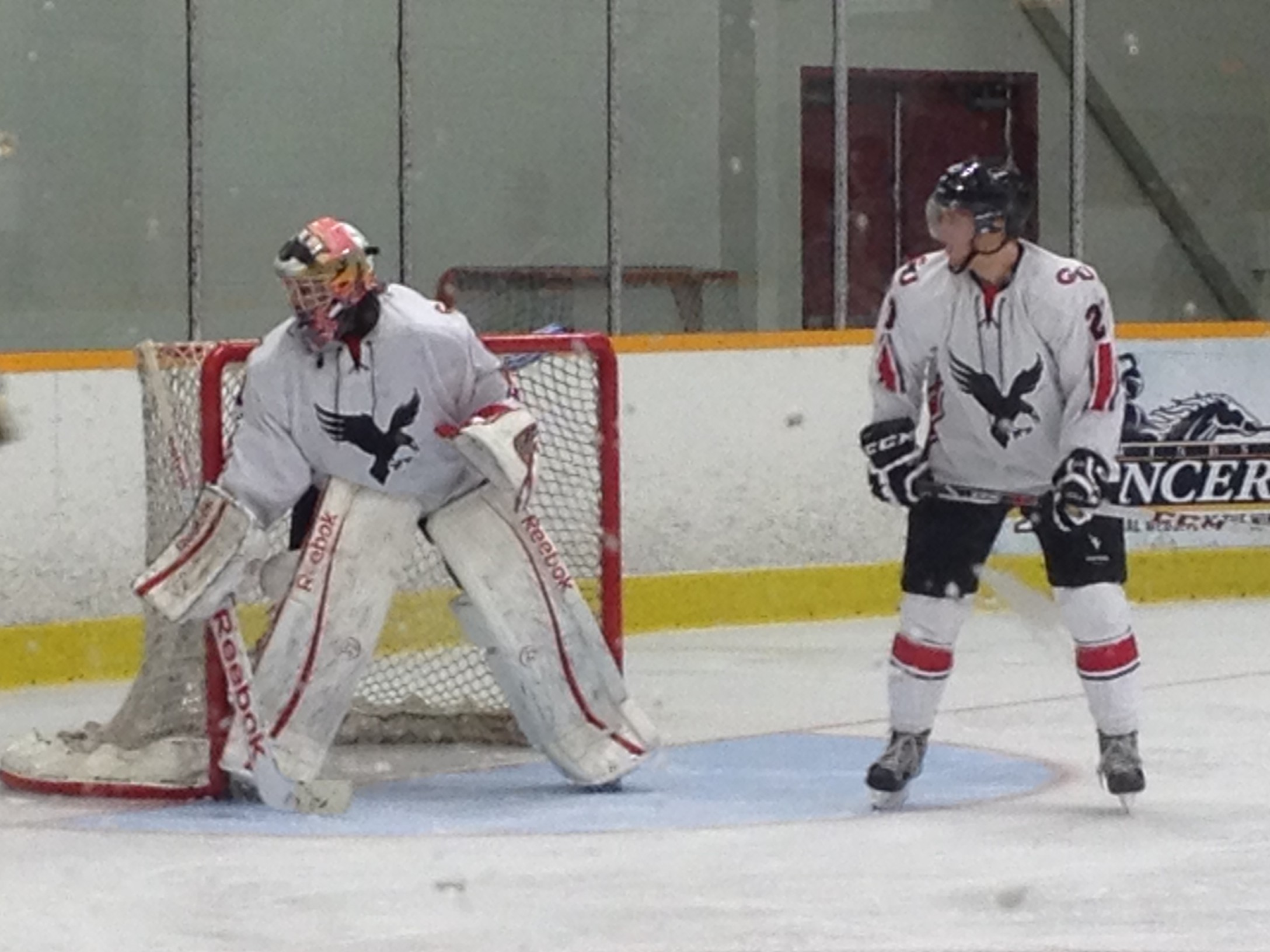
Carleton during 2013-14 season vs. Windsor Lancers.

The Carleton Ravens men's ice hockey team plays within the Ontario University Athletics conference of U Sports.

Former NHL hockey player Shaun Van Allen has led Carleton as head coach since the fall of 2017, when he took the program over from previous head coach Marty Johnston. Under Van Allen, the Ravens program has continued to be a consistently-.500 team into a perennial threat in the OUA's Eastern Conference. Despite a plethora of regular-season success, the program has repeatedly been handed early playoff exits by the arch-rival UQTR Patriotes. The Ravens overcame the Patriotes in the 2019 playoffs en route to winning the OUA Bronze medal.

Season	W	L	OTL	GF	GA	Pts.	Finish
2007–08	12	13	3	88	110	27	4th, OUA Far East
2008–09	13	11	4	91	89	30	4th, OUA Far East
2009–10	15	10	3	101	87	33	4th, OUA East
2010–11	18	8	2	108	67	38	3rd, OUA East
2011–12	15	10	3	100	78	33	7th, OUA East
2012–13	19	7	2	101	75	40	2nd, OUA East
2013–14	22	5	1	128	67	45	1st, OUA East
2014–15	20	5	1	108	58	41	2nd, OUA East
2015–16	20	7	1	116	62	41	3rd, OUA East
2016–17	16	9	3	98	62	35	5th, OUA East
2017–18	15	9	4	98	76	38	4th, OUA East
2018–19	17	8	5	99	75	41	2nd, OUA East
2019–20	24	3	1	102	62	49	1st, OUA East
2021–22	4	4	3	31	36	11	4th, OUA Far East

=== Women's ice hockey ===
Season	W	L	T	OTL	PF	PF	Pts.	Finish
2004–05	0	14	1	0	12	83	1	4th, QSSF
2005–06	0	14	0	1	13	61	1	4th, QSSF
2006–07	5	13	0	0	26	63	10	3rd, QSSF
2007–08	7	11	0	0	27	57	14	3rd, QSSF
2008–09	7	11	–	0	31	61	14	3rd, QSSF
2009–10	8	12	–	0	39	47	16	4th, Quebec
2010–11	7	8	–	5	46	59	19	4th, RSEQ
2011–12	9	8	–	3	53	75	21	3rd, RSEQ
2012–13	7	12	–	1	46	85	15	4th, RSEQ
2013–14	1	15	4	1	32	90	6	6th, RSEQ
2014–15	3	17	–	0	24	96	6	5th, RSEQ
2015–16	5	15	–	0	23	65	10	5th, RSEQ

=== Men's soccer ===
Carleton also has a soccer team. In 2002, the team lost the finals 1–0 in OT to the Brock Badgers. They were OUA champions again in 2005, but lost in the quarter-finals of the national championships. In 2012, the Ravens men's soccer team advanced to CIS (now U Sports) Nationals and finished in 6th place at the CIS Championship Finals.

Season	W	L	T	PF	PA	Pts.	Finish
2002	10	0	2	33	8	32	1st, OUA South/East
2003	6	3	3	27	12	21	4th, OUA South/East
2004	8	2	0	30	11	19	1st, OUA East
2005	7	0	3	22	4	24	1st, OUA East
2006	9	1	4	31	7	24	2nd, OUA East
2007	13	0	1	40	7	33	1st, OUA East
2008	12	1	1	35	10	37	1st, OUA East
2009	9	5	2	26	17	29	2nd, OUA East
2010	9	3	2	16	5	29	2nd, OUA East
2011	11	3	0	41	14	33	1st, OUA East
2012	10	2	2	36	13	32	2nd, OUA East
2013	8	3	3	26	11	27	2nd, OUA East
2014	9	4	3	29	16	30	4th, OUA East
2015	8	2	6	26	11	30	4th, OUA East

=== Women's soccer ===
Despite having successful regular seasons, the women's soccer team has had little success in the playoffs.

Season	W	L	T	PF	PA	Pts.	Finish
2002	5	3	2	7	4	17	3rd, OUA East
2003	4	2	4	15	6	16	3rd, OUA East
2004	6	4	2	24	12	20	3rd, OUA East
2005	7	2	3	27	9	24	3rd, OUA East
2006	11	2	3	30	10	36	2nd, OUA East
2007	9	5	2	29	15	29	4th, OUA East
2008	6	6	2	18	14	20	6th, OUA East
2009	6	8	2	15	17	20	5th, OUA East
2010	7	6	3	20	17	24	4th, OUA East
2011	8	6	2	28	19	26	4th, OUA East
2012	9	5	2	36	26	29	5th, OUA East
2013	9	3	4	44	14	31	3rd, OUA East
2014	7	5	4	29	19	25	5th, OUA East
2015	7	6	3	27	13	24	6th, OUA East

== Club sports ==
Men's sports	Women's sports
Baseball	Artistic swimming
Curling	Curiing
Rugby	Equestrian
Swimming	Figure skating
Lacrosse	Swimming
Track and field	Track and field
Ultimate frisbee	Ultimate frisbee
Water polo	Water polo

== Rivalries ==
=== Ottawa Gee-Gees ===
Carleton's biggest rivals are the Gee-Gees of the University of Ottawa. An annual football game known as the Panda Game is played between the cross-town rivals. It is the most well known rivalry game in Canadian collegiate football. Since its inception in 1955, the Gee-Gees have won 33 to Carleton's 13. From 1998 to 2012, Carleton did not have a football program so the Panda Game was not held.

Today, the rivalry has extended to the schools' basketball teams, as both universities have men's and women's teams that finish near the top of the standings. On January 23, 2007, the two men's basketball teams faced off at Scotiabank Place, now known as Canadian Tire Centre, in front of nearly 9,720 spectators, which was a record crowd for a regular season U Sports basketball game. The Ottawa Gee-Gees won the inaugural event 64–62. The event, now known as the Capital Hoops Classic, has been expanded to include the women's teams as well, with the Classic featuring a doubleheader of both teams. The January 28, 2009 edition of the game broke the 2007 record with 10,523 fans attending the two games, with both of Carleton's teams posting victories over Ottawa. In the 2013–14 season the teams faced each other both in the provincial and national finals, with uOttawa winning the OUA championship and Carleton winning the national title. In 2014–15, the two teams met again in the national championship game, with Carleton once again winning.

The rivalry also extends to Men's Rugby where the two teams play annually around Halloween for the Pumpkin Bowl Trophy. Started in 2015, the two teams have played this match almost every year since, taking turns hosting, but Carleton has never won this trophy.

== Notable athletes ==
=== Basketball ===
- Ryan Bell
- Aaron Doornekamp
- Tyson Hinz
- Osvaldo Jeanty
- Kaza Kajami-Keane
- Philip Scrubb
- Thomas Scrubb
- Stuart Turnbull
- Dave Smart (coach)
- Rob Smart (player, coach)
- Connor Wood

=== Curling ===
- Lauren Horton
- Lynn Kreviazuk
- Jamie Sinclair

=== Football ===
- Tunde Adeleke
- Michael Allen
- Nate Behar
- Carl Coulter
- Jason Kralt
- Cameron Legault

=== Soccer ===
- Gabriel Bitar

== Athletes of the Year ==
This is an incomplete list

Year	Athlete (female)	Sport	Athlete (male)	Sport	Ref.
2010–11	Alyson Bush	Basketball	Tyson Hinz	Basketball	
2011–12
2012–13
2013–14
2014–15	Natasha Smith	Rugby	Thomas Scrubb	Basketball	
2015–16	Megan Evans	Nordic Skiing	Brett Welychka	Men’s Hockey	
2016–17	Heather Lindsay	Women’s Basketball	Kaza Kajami-Keane	Men’s basketball	
2017–18	Elizabeth Leblanc	Women's Basketball	Gabriel Bitar	Men's Soccer	
2018–19	Zöe Williams	Nordic Skiing	Eddie Ekiyor	Basketball	
2019–20	Zöe Williams	Nordic Skiing	Jack Cassar	Football	

== See also ==
- U Sports
- U Sports men's basketball championship
