= 2011 CIS Women's Volleyball Championship =

- Season: 2010–11
- Teams: Eight
- Finals site: PEPS; Quebec City, Quebec
- Champions: UBC Thunderbirds (8th title)
- Runner-up: Laval Rouge et Or
- Winning coach: Doug Reimer (5th title)
- Championship MVP: Shanice Marcelle (UBC Thunderbirds)

The 2011 CIS Women's Volleyball Championship was held March 4, 2011 to March 6, 2011, in Quebec City, Quebec, to determine a national champion for the 2010–11 CIS women's volleyball season. The tournament was played at PEPS at Université Laval. It was the sixth time that Laval had hosted the tournament and the first time since hosting back-to-back tournaments in 2002 and 2003.

The top-seeded UBC Thunderbirds won their fourth consecutive national championship following their sweep of the host Laval Rouge et Or. With the victory, the Thunderbirds set a CIS record with the eighth championship win in program history, which broke a three-way tie with the Winnipeg Wesmen and Alberta Pandas who had won seven each.

== Participating teams ==
Seed	Team	Qualified	Record	Last	Total
1	UBC Thunderbirds	Canada West Champion	15–3	2010	7
2	Trinity Western Spartans	Canada West Finalist	15–3	None	0
3	Laval Rouge et Or	RSEQ Champion (Host)	17–3	2006	1
4	Alberta Pandas	Canada West Bronze	11–7	2007	7
5	Montreal Carabins	RSEQ Finalist	17–3	None	0
6	UNB Varsity Reds	AUS Champion	11–7	None	0
7	Western Ontario Mustangs	OUA Champion	15–4	1976	3
8	Sherbrooke Vert et Or	RSEQ Bronze	11–7	2005	2

== Championship bracket ==
First Round: March 4
1	UBC Thunderbirds	3
8	Sherbrooke Vert et Or	1
4	Alberta Pandas	3
5	Montreal Carabins	1
2	Trinity Western Spartans	3
7	Western Ontario Mustangs	2
3	Laval Rouge et Or	3
6	UNB Varsity Reds	1

Semi-Finals: March 5
1	UBC Thunderbirds	3
4	Alberta Pandas	0
2	Trinity Western Spartans	1
3	Laval Rouge et Or	3

Gold Medal Game: March 6
1	UBC Thunderbirds	3
3	Laval Rouge et Or	0
Bronze Medal Game: March 6
2	Trinity Western Spartans	3
4	Alberta Pandas	1

== Consolation bracket ==
Semi-Finals: March 5
5	Montreal Carabins	3
8	Sherbrooke Vert et Or	0
6	UNB Varsity Reds	0
7	Western Ontario Mustangs	3

Fifth Place Game: March 6
5	Montreal Carabins	3
7	Western Ontario Mustangs	1

== Awards ==
=== Championship awards ===
- CIS Tournament MVP – Shanice Marcelle, UBC
- R.W. Pugh Fair Play Award – Brina Derksen-Bergen, UBC

=== All-Star Team ===
- Jaki Ellis, Alberta
- Lauren O'Reilly, Trinity Western
- Mélanie Savoie, Laval
- Shanice Marcelle, UBC
- Marie-Christine Mondor, Laval
- Jen Hinze, UBC
- Kyla Richey, UBC
