= 2012 CIS Women's Volleyball Championship =

- Season: 2011–12
- Teams: Eight
- Finals site: Burridge Gymnasium; Hamilton, Ontario
- Champions: UBC Thunderbirds (9th title)
- Runner-up: Alberta Pandas
- Winning coach: Doug Reimer (6th title)
- Championship MVP: Lisa Barclay (UBC Thunderbirds)

The 2012 CIS Women's Volleyball Championship was held March 2, 2012 to March 4, 2012, in Hamilton, Ontario, to determine a national champion for the 2011–12 CIS women's volleyball season. The tournament was played at the Burridge Gymnasium at McMaster University. It was the second time that McMaster had hosted the tournament with the first time occurring in 1979.

The second-seeded UBC Thunderbirds won their fifth consecutive national championship in their five-set win over the top-seeded Alberta Pandas. The gold medal game was a rematch of the Canada West finals that had also gone to five sets, but eventually was won by the Pandas.

== Participating teams ==
Seed	Team	Qualified	Record	Last	Total
1	Alberta Pandas	Canada West Champion	14–6	2007	7
2	UBC Thunderbirds	Canada West Finalist	18–2	2011	8
3	Montreal Carabins	RSEQ Champion	12–3	None	0
4	Saint Mary's Huskies	AUS Champion	16–1	None	0
5	McGill Martlets	RSEQ Finalist	5–10	None	0
6	Trinity Western Spartans	Canada West Bronze	13–7	None	0
7	Queen's Gaels	OUA Champion	13–5	None	0
8	McMaster Marauders	OUA Quarter-Finalist (Host)	11–7	None	0

== Championship bracket ==
First Round: March 2
1	Alberta Pandas	3
8	McMaster Marauders	1
4	Saint Mary's Huskies	2
5	McGill Martlets	3
2	UBC Thunderbirds	3
7	Queen's Gaels	0
3	Montreal Carabins	3
6	Trinity Western Spartans	1

Semi-Finals: March 3
1	Alberta Pandas	3
5	McGill Martlets	0
2	UBC Thunderbirds	3
3	Montreal Carabins	1

Gold Medal Game: March 4
1	Alberta Pandas	2
2	UBC Thunderbirds	3
Bronze Medal Game: March 4
3	Montreal Carabins	1
5	McGill Martlets	3

== Consolation bracket ==
Semi-Finals: March 3
4	Saint Mary's Huskies	3
8	McMaster Marauders	2
6	Trinity Western Spartans	3
7	Queen's Gaels	0

Fifth Place Game: March 4
4	Saint Mary's Huskies	1
7	Trinity Western Spartans	3

== Awards ==
=== Championship awards ===
- CIS Tournament MVP – Lisa Barclay, UBC
- R.W. Pugh Fair Play Award – Briana Liau Kent, UBC

=== All-Star Team ===
- Lisa Barclay, UBC
- Shanice Marcelle, UBC
- Brina Derksen-Bergen, UBC
- Alena Omelchenko, Alberta
- Jaki Ellis, Alberta
- Geneviève Plante, McGill
- Marie-Sophie Nadeau, Montreal
