= 2009 CIS Women's Volleyball Championship =

- Season: 2008–09
- Teams: Eight
- Finals site: Aitken University Centre; Fredericton, New Brunswick
- Champions: UBC Thunderbirds (6th title)
- Runner-up: Calgary Dinos
- Winning coach: Doug Reimer (3rd title)
- Championship MVP: Kyla Richey (UBC Thunderbirds)

The 2009 CIS Women's Volleyball Championship was held February 26, 2009 to February 28, 2009, in Fredericton, New Brunswick, to determine a national champion for the 2008–09 CIS women's volleyball season. The tournament was played at the Aitken University Centre and was hosted by the University of New Brunswick. It was the second consecutive year that the University of New Brunswick had hosted the tournament following their first ever hosting duties in 2008.

The Canada West champion UBC Thunderbirds repeated as national champions following their five-set match victory over the fourth-seeded Calgary Dinos. The Thunderbirds became the first team to win consecutive championships since the Manitoba Bisons in 2001 and 2002.

== Participating teams ==
Seed	Team	Qualified	Record	Last	Total
1	Montreal Carabins	QSSF Champion	20–1	None	0
2	UBC Thunderbirds	Canada West Champion	15–5	2009	5
3	Trinity Western Spartans	Canada West Finalist	14–6	None	0
4	Calgary Dinos	Canada West Bronze	16–4	2004	3
5	York Lions	OUA Champion	18–1	None	0
6	Laval Rouge et Or	QSSF Finalist	14–7	2006	1
7	Moncton Aigles Bleues	AUS Champion	15–5	None	0
8	UNB Varsity Reds	AUS Finalist (Host)	12–8	None	0

== Championship bracket ==
First Round: February 26
1	Montreal Carabins	3
8	UNB Varsity Reds	0
4	Calgary Dinos	3
5	York Lions	0
2	UBC Thunderbirds	3
7	Moncton Aigles Bleues	1
3	Trinity Western Spartans	1
6	Laval Rouge et Or	3

Semi-Finals: February 27
1	Montreal Carabins	2
4	Calgary Dinos	3
2	UBC Thunderbirds	3
6	Laval Rouge et Or	0

Gold Medal Game: February 28
2	UBC Thunderbirds	3
4	Calgary Dinos	2
Bronze Medal Game: February 28
1	Montreal Carabins	3
6	Laval Rouge et Or	2

== Consolation bracket ==
Semi-Finals: February 27
3	Trinity Western Spartans	3
7	Moncton Aigles Bleues	0
5	York Lions	3
8	UNB Varsity Reds	1

Fifth Place Game: February 28
3	Trinity Western Spartans	3
5	York Lions	2

== Awards ==
=== Championship awards ===
- CIS Tournament MVP – Kyla Richey, UBC
- R.W. Pugh Fair Play Award – Angela Frawley, York

=== All-Star Team ===
- Marie-Christine Mondor, Laval
- Laetitia Tchoualack, Montreal
- Holly Harper, Calgary
- Lauren Perry, Calgary
- Kyla Richey, UBC
- Marisa Field, UBC
- Shanice Marcelle, UBC
