= 2025 Beach Volleyball World Championships – Women's tournament =

Tournament details
- Host country: Australia
- City: Adelaide
- Dates: 14–23 November
- Teams: 48 (from 5 confederations)
- Venue: 1

Final positions
- Champions: Latvia; Tīna Graudiņa; Anastasija Samoilova (1st title)
- Runners-up: United States; Kristen Nuss; Taryn Brasher
- Third place: Brazil; Carolina Solberg Salgado; Rebecca Cavalcante
- Fourth place: Brazil; Thamela Coradello Galil; Victória Lopes

The women's tournament of the 2025 Beach Volleyball World Championships was held from 14 to 23 November 2025.

== Schedule ==
The 48 teams were split into twelve pools, where the first two and the four best-third placed teams advanced to the knockout stage. The remaining eight third-ranked teams played in a lucky loser round to determine the last four teams. After that, a knockout system was used.

| P | Preliminary round | LL | Lucky losers playoffs | 1/16 | Round of 32 | 1/8 | Round of 16 | ¼ | Quarter-finals | 1/2 | Semi-finals | B | Bronze medal match | F | Final |

| Fri 14 | Sat 15 | Sun 16 | Mon 17 | Tue 18 | | Wed 19 | Thu 20 | Fri 21 | Sat 22 | Sun 23 | |
|---|---|---|---|---|---|---|---|---|---|---|---|
| P | P | P | P | LL | 1/16 | 1/16 | 1/8 | 1/4 | 1/2 | B | F |

== Preliminary round ==
The draw was held on 9 October 2025. If two teams are tied in points, the overall set and points ratio will be used. If three teams are tied on points, the matches against those teams determine the ranking.

All times are local (UTC+10:30).

=== Pool A ===
| Pos | Team | Pld | W | L | Pts | SW | SL | SR | SPW | SPL | SPR | Qualification |
|---|---|---|---|---|---|---|---|---|---|---|---|---|
| 1 | (Brazil) Thamela – Victória | 3 | 3 | 0 | 6 | 6 | 1 | 6.000 | 144 | 122 | 1.180 | Round of 32 |
| 2 | (Ukraine) Lazarenko – Romaniuk | 3 | 2 | 1 | 5 | 5 | 2 | 2.500 | 134 | 125 | 1.072 | Round of 32 |
| 3 | (Paraguay) Michelle – Corrales | 3 | 1 | 2 | 4 | 2 | 4 | 0.500 | 104 | 118 | 0.881 | lucky loser |
| 4 | (Peru) Gaona – Allcca | 3 | 0 | 3 | 3 | 0 | 6 | 0.000 | 113 | 130 | 0.869 | |

Source: FIVB

| 14 November 2025; 11:00 | Thamela – Victória (Brazil) | 2–0 | (Peru) Gaona – Allcca | Central court Referees: Carlos Rivera (PUR), José María Padron (ESP) |
| 14 November 2025; 11:00 | (21–19, 25–23); Report | | | Central court Referees: Carlos Rivera (PUR), José María Padron (ESP) |

| 14 November 2025; 12:00 | Lazarenko – Romaniuk (Ukraine) | 2–0 | (Paraguay) Michelle – Corrales | Court 3 Referees: Rui Carvalho (POR), Wang Lijun (CHN) |
| 14 November 2025; 12:00 | (21–17, 21–15); Report | | | Court 3 Referees: Rui Carvalho (POR), Wang Lijun (CHN) |

| 15 November 2025; 10:00 | Lazarenko – Romaniuk (Ukraine) | 2–0 | (Peru) Gaona – Allcca | Court 2 Referees: Tim Cleaver (NZL), Osvaldo Sumavil (ARG) |
| 15 November 2025; 10:00 | (21–19, 21–18); Report | | | Court 2 Referees: Tim Cleaver (NZL), Osvaldo Sumavil (ARG) |

| 15 November 2025; 16:00 | Thamela – Victória (Brazil) | 2–0 | (Paraguay) Michelle – Corrales | Court 2 Referees: Tim Cleaver (NZL), Osvaldo Sumavil (ARG) |
| 15 November 2025; 16:00 | (21–16, 21–14); Report | | | Court 2 Referees: Tim Cleaver (NZL), Osvaldo Sumavil (ARG) |

| 17 November 2025; 11:00 | Thamela – Victória (Brazil) | 2–1 | (Ukraine) Lazarenko – Romaniuk | Central court Referees: Osvaldo Sumavil (ARG), Wang Lijun (CHN) |
| 17 November 2025; 11:00 | (19–21, 21–15, 16–14); Report | | | Central court Referees: Osvaldo Sumavil (ARG), Wang Lijun (CHN) |

| 17 November 2025; 15:00 | Michelle – Corrales (Paraguay) | 2–0 | (Peru) Gaona – Allcca | Court 3 Referees: Vincent Roche (FRA), Juan Carlos Saavedra (COL) |
| 17 November 2025; 15:00 | (21–18, 21–16); Report | | | Court 3 Referees: Vincent Roche (FRA), Juan Carlos Saavedra (COL) |

=== Pool B ===
| Pos | Team | Pld | W | L | Pts | SW | SL | SR | SPW | SPL | SPR | Qualification |
|---|---|---|---|---|---|---|---|---|---|---|---|---|
| 1 | (Brazil) Carol – Rebecca | 3 | 3 | 0 | 6 | 6 | 0 | MAX | 126 | 68 | 1.853 | Round of 32 |
| 2 | (Ukraine) Davidova – Khmil | 3 | 2 | 1 | 5 | 4 | 3 | 1.333 | 128 | 96 | 1.333 | Round of 32 |
| 3 | (Netherlands) Konink – Poiesz | 3 | 1 | 2 | 4 | 3 | 4 | 0.750 | 106 | 123 | 0.862 | Round of 32 |
| 4 | (Egypt) Marwa – Nada | 3 | 0 | 3 | 3 | 0 | 6 | 0.000 | 53 | 126 | 0.421 | |

Source: FIVB

| 14 November 2025; 12:00 | Davidova – Khmil (Ukraine) | 2–1 | (Netherlands) Konink – Poiesz | Court 2 Referees: Giseli Amantino (BRA), Giovanni Bake (RSA) |
| 14 November 2025; 12:00 | (18–21, 21–14, 15–8); Report | | | Court 2 Referees: Giseli Amantino (BRA), Giovanni Bake (RSA) |

| 14 November 2025; 17:00 | Carol – Rebecca (Brazil) | 2–0 | (Egypt) Marwa – Nada | Central court Referees: Suzanne Lowry (USA), Giuseppe Curto (ITA) |
| 14 November 2025; 17:00 | (21–7, 21–8); Report | | | Central court Referees: Suzanne Lowry (USA), Giuseppe Curto (ITA) |

| 15 November 2025; 10:00 | Davidova – Khmil (Ukraine) | 2–0 | (Egypt) Marwa – Nada | Court 3 Referees: Carlos Rivera (PUR), Suzanne Lowry (USA) |
| 15 November 2025; 10:00 | (21–5, 21–6); Report | | | Court 3 Referees: Carlos Rivera (PUR), Suzanne Lowry (USA) |

| 15 November 2025; 11:00 | Carol – Rebecca (Brazil) | 2–0 | (Netherlands) Konink – Poiesz | Central court Referees: Milan Vachutka (CZE), Brian Hiebert (CAN) |
| 15 November 2025; 11:00 | (21–12, 21–9); Report | | | Central court Referees: Milan Vachutka (CZE), Brian Hiebert (CAN) |

| 17 November 2025; 09:00 | Carol – Rebecca (Brazil) | 2–0 | (Ukraine) Davidova – Khmil | Court 2 Referees: José María Padron (ESP), Charalampos Papadogoulas (GRE) |
| 17 November 2025; 09:00 | (21–17, 21–15); Report | | | Court 2 Referees: José María Padron (ESP), Charalampos Papadogoulas (GRE) |

| 17 November 2025; 09:00 | Konink – Poiesz (Netherlands) | 2–0 | (Egypt) Marwa – Nada | Court 3 Referees: Vincent Roche (FRA), Juan Carlos Saavedra (COL) |
| 17 November 2025; 09:00 | (21–15, 21–12); Report | | | Court 3 Referees: Vincent Roche (FRA), Juan Carlos Saavedra (COL) |

=== Pool C ===
| Pos | Team | Pld | W | L | Pts | SW | SL | SR | SPW | SPL | SPR | Qualification |
|---|---|---|---|---|---|---|---|---|---|---|---|---|
| 1 | (United States) Nuss – Brasher | 3 | 3 | 0 | 6 | 6 | 0 | MAX | 126 | 88 | 1.432 | Round of 32 |
| 2 | (Netherlands) Van Driel – Bekhuis | 3 | 1 | 2 | 4 | 2 | 4 | 0.500 | 104 | 110 | 0.945 | Round of 32 |
| 3 | (Czech Republic) Kylie – Maixnerová | 3 | 1 | 2 | 4 | 2 | 4 | 0.500 | 99 | 108 | 0.917 | lucky loser |
| 4 | (Brazil) Vitória – Hegeile | 3 | 1 | 2 | 4 | 2 | 4 | 0.500 | 96 | 119 | 0.807 | |

Source: FIVB

| 14 November 2025; 18:00 | Nuss – Brasher (United States) | 2–0 | (Czech Republic) Kylie – Maixnerová | Court 3 Referees: Rui Carvalho (POR), Wang Lijun (CHN) |
| 14 November 2025; 18:00 | (21–13, 21–18); Report | | | Court 3 Referees: Rui Carvalho (POR), Wang Lijun (CHN) |

| 14 November 2025; 19:30 | Van Driel – Bekhuis (Netherlands) | 0–2 | (Brazil) Vitória – Hegeile | Court 3 Referees: Charalampos Papadogoulas (GRE), Tim Cleaver (NZL) |
| 14 November 2025; 19:30 | (19–21, 16–21); Report | | | Court 3 Referees: Charalampos Papadogoulas (GRE), Tim Cleaver (NZL) |

| 16 November 2025; 09:00 | Nuss – Brasher (United States) | 2–0 | (Brazil) Vitória – Hegeile | Central court Referees: José María Padron (ESP), Giovanni Bake (RSA) |
| 16 November 2025; 09:00 | (21–11, 21–19); Report | | | Central court Referees: José María Padron (ESP), Giovanni Bake (RSA) |

| 16 November 2025; 11:00 | Van Driel – Bekhuis (Netherlands) | 2–0 | (Czech Republic) Kylie – Maixnerová | Court 3 Referees: Vincent Roche (FRA), Giseli Amantino (BRA) |
| 16 November 2025; 11:00 | (21–10, 21–16); Report | | | Court 3 Referees: Vincent Roche (FRA), Giseli Amantino (BRA) |

| 17 November 2025; 10:00 | Nuss – Brasher (United States) | 2–0 | (Netherlands) Van Driel – Bekhuis | Court 2 Referees: Brian Hiebert (CAN), Giseli Amantino (BRA) |
| 17 November 2025; 10:00 | (21–12, 21–15); Report | | | Court 2 Referees: Brian Hiebert (CAN), Giseli Amantino (BRA) |

| 17 November 2025; 10:00 | Vitória – Hegeile (Brazil) | 0–2 | (Czech Republic) Kylie – Maixnerová | Court 3 Referees: Tim Cleaver (NZL), Carlos Rivera (PUR) |
| 17 November 2025; 10:00 | (7–21, 17–21); Report | | | Court 3 Referees: Tim Cleaver (NZL), Carlos Rivera (PUR) |

=== Pool D ===
| Pos | Team | Pld | W | L | Pts | SW | SL | SR | SPW | SPL | SPR | Qualification |
|---|---|---|---|---|---|---|---|---|---|---|---|---|
| 1 | (United States) Cannon – Kraft | 3 | 3 | 0 | 6 | 6 | 1 | 6.000 | 141 | 98 | 1.439 | Round of 32 |
| 2 | (Germany) Ittlinger – Grüne | 3 | 2 | 1 | 5 | 5 | 2 | 2.500 | 136 | 112 | 1.214 | Round of 32 |
| 3 | (France) Placette – Richard | 3 | 1 | 2 | 4 | 2 | 4 | 0.500 | 113 | 118 | 0.958 | lucky loser |
| 4 | (Mozambique) Vanessa – Mucheza | 3 | 0 | 3 | 3 | 0 | 6 | 0.000 | 64 | 126 | 0.508 | |

Source: FIVB

| 14 November 2025; 20:30 | Cannon – Kraft (United States) | 2–0 | (Mozambique) Vanessa – Mucheza | Court 3 Referees: Brian Hiebert (CAN), Rui Carvalho (POR) |
| 14 November 2025; 20:30 | (21–6, 22–9); Report | | | Court 3 Referees: Brian Hiebert (CAN), Rui Carvalho (POR) |

| 14 November 2025; 20:30 | Ittlinger – Grüne (Germany) | 2–0 | (France) Placette – Richard | Court 2 Referees: Giovanni Bake (RSA), Agnieszka Myszkowska (POL) |
| 14 November 2025; 20:30 | (21–19, 22–20); Report | | | Court 2 Referees: Giovanni Bake (RSA), Agnieszka Myszkowska (POL) |

| 16 November 2025; 12:00 | Cannon – Kraft (United States) | 2–0 | (France) Placette – Richard | Court 3 Referees: Giuseppe Curto (ITA), Wang Lijun (CHN) |
| 16 November 2025; 12:00 | (21–19, 21–13); Report | | | Court 3 Referees: Giuseppe Curto (ITA), Wang Lijun (CHN) |

| 16 November 2025; 16:00 | Ittlinger – Grüne (Germany) | 2–0 | (Mozambique) Vanessa – Mucheza | Court 2 Referees: Brian Hiebert (CAN), Suzanne Lowry (USA) |
| 16 November 2025; 16:00 | (21–10, 21–6); Report | | | Court 2 Referees: Brian Hiebert (CAN), Suzanne Lowry (USA) |

| 17 November 2025; 14:00 | Cannon – Kraft (United States) | 2–1 | (Germany) Ittlinger – Grüne | Central court Referees: Agnieszka Myszkowska (POL), Osvaldo Sumavil (ARG) |
| 17 November 2025; 14:00 | (20–22, 21–15, 16–14); Report | | | Central court Referees: Agnieszka Myszkowska (POL), Osvaldo Sumavil (ARG) |

| 17 November 2025; 14:00 | Placette – Richard (France) | 2–0 | (Mozambique) Vanessa – Mucheza | Court 3 Referees: Carlos Rivera (PUR), Giuseppe Curto (ITA) |
| 17 November 2025; 14:00 | (21–16, 21–17); Report | | | Court 3 Referees: Carlos Rivera (PUR), Giuseppe Curto (ITA) |

=== Pool E ===
| Pos | Team | Pld | W | L | Pts | SW | SL | SR | SPW | SPL | SPR | Qualification |
|---|---|---|---|---|---|---|---|---|---|---|---|---|
| 1 | (Latvia) Tīna – Anastasija | 3 | 3 | 0 | 6 | 6 | 0 | MAX | 129 | 108 | 1.194 | Round of 32 |
| 2 | (Japan) Shiba – Murakami | 3 | 2 | 1 | 5 | 4 | 2 | 2.000 | 124 | 114 | 1.088 | Round of 32 |
| 3 | (Italy) Scampoli – Bianchi | 3 | 1 | 2 | 4 | 2 | 5 | 0.400 | 125 | 134 | 0.933 | lucky loser |
| 4 | (Mexico) Torres – Gutiérrez | 3 | 0 | 3 | 3 | 1 | 6 | 0.167 | 120 | 142 | 0.845 | |

Source: FIVB

| 15 November 2025; 11:00 | Tīna – Anastasija (Latvia) | 2–0 | (Mexico) Torres – Gutiérrez | Court 2 Referees: Juan Carlos Saavedra (COL), Giovanni Bake (RSA) |
| 15 November 2025; 11:00 | (21–17, 23–21); Report | | | Court 2 Referees: Juan Carlos Saavedra (COL), Giovanni Bake (RSA) |

| 15 November 2025; 12:00 | Scampoli – Bianchi (Italy) | 0–2 | (Japan) Shiba – Murakami | Court 3 Referees: José María Padron (ESP), Vincent Roche (FRA) |
| 15 November 2025; 12:00 | (22–24, 14–21); Report | | | Court 3 Referees: José María Padron (ESP), Vincent Roche (FRA) |

| 16 November 2025; 10:00 | Scampoli – Bianchi (Italy) | 2–1 | (Mexico) Torres – Gutiérrez | Court 2 Referees: Rui Carvalho (POR), Milan Vachutka (CZE) |
| 16 November 2025; 10:00 | (18–21, 21–15, 15–13); Report | | | Court 2 Referees: Rui Carvalho (POR), Milan Vachutka (CZE) |

| 16 November 2025; 16:00 | Tīna – Anastasija (Latvia) | 2–0 | (Japan) Shiba – Murakami | Central court Referees: Carlos Rivera (PUR), Charalampos Papadogoulas (GRE) |
| 16 November 2025; 16:00 | (21–18, 21–17); Report | | | Central court Referees: Carlos Rivera (PUR), Charalampos Papadogoulas (GRE) |

| 17 November 2025; 15:00 | Tīna – Anastasija (Latvia) | 2–0 | (Italy) Scampoli – Bianchi | Court 2 Referees: Brian Hiebert (CAN), Giseli Amantino (BRA) |
| 17 November 2025; 15:00 | (22–20, 21–15); Report | | | Court 2 Referees: Brian Hiebert (CAN), Giseli Amantino (BRA) |

| 17 November 2025; 16:00 | Shiba – Murakami (Japan) | 2–0 | (Mexico) Torres – Gutiérrez | Central court Referees: Wang Lijun (CHN), Agnieszka Myszkowska (POL) |
| 17 November 2025; 16:00 | (21–15, 23–21); Report | | | Central court Referees: Wang Lijun (CHN), Agnieszka Myszkowska (POL) |

=== Pool F ===
| Pos | Team | Pld | W | L | Pts | SW | SL | SR | SPW | SPL | SPR | Qualification |
|---|---|---|---|---|---|---|---|---|---|---|---|---|
| 1 | (Brazil) Ana Patrícia – Duda | 3 | 3 | 0 | 6 | 6 | 0 | MAX | 84 | 68 | 1.235 | Round of 32 |
| 2 | (Czech Republic) Svozilová – Štochlová | 3 | 2 | 1 | 5 | 4 | 2 | 2.000 | 84 | 94 | 0.894 | Round of 32 |
| 3 | (Australia) Phillips – Mears | 3 | 1 | 2 | 4 | 2 | 4 | 0.500 | 101 | 123 | 0.821 | lucky loser |
| 4 | (Poland) Okla – Łunio | 3 | 0 | 3 | 3 | 0 | 6 | 0.000 | 102 | 128 | 0.797 | |

Source: FIVB

| 14 November 2025; 10:00 | Ana Patrícia – Duda (Brazil) | 2–0 | (Australia) Phillips – Mears | Central court Referees: Suzanne Lowry (USA), Giuseppe Curto (ITA) |
| 14 November 2025; 10:00 | (21–16, 21–19); Report | | | Central court Referees: Suzanne Lowry (USA), Giuseppe Curto (ITA) |

| 14 November 2025; 16:00 | Svozilová – Štochlová (Czech Republic) | 2–0 | (Poland) Okla – Łunio | Court 3 Referees: Wang Lijun (CHN), Charalampos Papadogoulas (GRE) |
| 14 November 2025; 16:00 | (21–15, 21–15); Report | | | Court 3 Referees: Wang Lijun (CHN), Charalampos Papadogoulas (GRE) |

| 15 November 2025; 12:00 | Svozilová – Štochlová (Czech Republic) | 2–0 | (Australia) Phillips – Mears | Central court Referees: Agnieszka Myszkowska (POL), Rui Carvalho (POR) |
| 15 November 2025; 12:00 | (21–11, 21–11); Report | | | Central court Referees: Agnieszka Myszkowska (POL), Rui Carvalho (POR) |

| 15 November 2025; 14:00 | Ana Patrícia – Duda (Brazil) | 2–0 | (Poland) Okla – Łunio | Court 3 Referees: Wang Lijun (CHN), Milan Vachutka (CZE) |
| 15 November 2025; 14:00 | (21–14, 21–19); Report | | | Court 3 Referees: Wang Lijun (CHN), Milan Vachutka (CZE) |

| 16 November 2025; 11:00 | Ana Patrícia – Duda (Brazil) | 2–0 | (Czech Republic) Svozilová – Štochlová | Court 2 Referees: Brian Hiebert (CAN), Suzanne Lowry (USA) |
| 16 November 2025; 11:00 | (21–0, 21–0); Report | | | Court 2 Referees: Brian Hiebert (CAN), Suzanne Lowry (USA) |

| 16 November 2025; 14:00 | Okla – Łunio (Poland) | 0–2 | (Australia) Phillips – Mears | Court 2 Referees: Suzanne Lowry (USA), Osvaldo Sumavil (ARG) |
| 16 November 2025; 14:00 | (18–21, 21–23); Report | | | Court 2 Referees: Suzanne Lowry (USA), Osvaldo Sumavil (ARG) |

=== Pool G ===
| Pos | Team | Pld | W | L | Pts | SW | SL | SR | SPW | SPL | SPR | Qualification |
|---|---|---|---|---|---|---|---|---|---|---|---|---|
| 1 | (Spain) Dani – Moreno | 3 | 3 | 0 | 6 | 6 | 1 | 6.000 | 137 | 128 | 1.070 | Round of 32 |
| 2 | (United States) Shaw – Cheng | 3 | 2 | 1 | 5 | 4 | 2 | 2.000 | 118 | 109 | 1.083 | Round of 32 |
| 3 | (Australia) Fleming – Fejes | 3 | 1 | 2 | 4 | 2 | 5 | 0.400 | 135 | 144 | 0.938 | lucky loser |
| 4 | (Lithuania) Paulikienė – Raupelytė | 3 | 0 | 3 | 3 | 2 | 6 | 0.333 | 137 | 146 | 0.938 | |

Source: FIVB

| 14 November 2025; 14:00 | Shaw – Cheng (United States) | 2–0 | (Australia) Fleming – Fejes | Central court Referees: Vincent Roche (FRA), Carlos Rivera (PUR) |
| 14 November 2025; 14:00 | (21–19, 21–18); Report | | | Central court Referees: Vincent Roche (FRA), Carlos Rivera (PUR) |

| 14 November 2025; 16:00 | Dani – Moreno (Spain) | 2–1 | (Lithuania) Paulikienė – Raupelytė | Court 2 Referees: Juan Carlos Saavedra (COL), Milan Vachutka (CZE) |
| 14 November 2025; 16:00 | (12–21, 21–19, 15–12); Report | | | Court 2 Referees: Juan Carlos Saavedra (COL), Milan Vachutka (CZE) |

| 15 November 2025; 15:00 | Shaw – Cheng (United States) | 2–0 | (Lithuania) Paulikienė – Raupelytė | Court 2 Referees: José María Padron (ESP), Vincent Roche (FRA) |
| 15 November 2025; 15:00 | (21–17, 21–13); Report | | | Court 2 Referees: José María Padron (ESP), Vincent Roche (FRA) |

| 15 November 2025; 17:00 | Dani – Moreno (Spain) | 2–0 | (Australia) Fleming – Fejes | Central court Referees: Rui Carvalho (POR), Giseli Amantino (BRA) |
| 15 November 2025; 17:00 | (21–18, 26–24); Report | | | Central court Referees: Rui Carvalho (POR), Giseli Amantino (BRA) |

| 16 November 2025; 15:00 | Paulikienė – Raupelytė (Lithuania) | 1–2 | (Australia) Fleming – Fejes | Central court Referees: Tim Cleaver (NZL), Carlos Rivera (PUR) |
| 16 November 2025; 15:00 | (24–26, 21–15, 10–15); Report | | | Central court Referees: Tim Cleaver (NZL), Carlos Rivera (PUR) |

| 16 November 2025; 16:00 | Shaw – Cheng (United States) | 0–2 | (Spain) Dani – Moreno | Court 3 Referees: Wang Lijun (CHN), Agnieszka Myszkowska (POL) |
| 16 November 2025; 16:00 | (17–21, 17–21); Report | | | Court 3 Referees: Wang Lijun (CHN), Agnieszka Myszkowska (POL) |

=== Pool H ===
| Pos | Team | Pld | W | L | Pts | SW | SL | SR | SPW | SPL | SPR | Qualification |
|---|---|---|---|---|---|---|---|---|---|---|---|---|
| 1 | (Germany) Bock – Lippmann | 3 | 3 | 0 | 6 | 6 | 1 | 6.000 | 135 | 109 | 1.239 | Round of 32 |
| 2 | (Germany) Müller – Tillmann | 3 | 2 | 1 | 5 | 5 | 3 | 1.667 | 148 | 128 | 1.156 | Round of 32 |
| 3 | (Puerto Rico) González – Navas | 3 | 1 | 2 | 4 | 3 | 4 | 0.750 | 121 | 127 | 0.953 | Round of 32 |
| 4 | (Argentina) Churin – Abdala | 3 | 0 | 3 | 3 | 0 | 6 | 0.000 | 86 | 126 | 0.683 | |

Source: FIVB

| 15 November 2025; 13:00 | Müller – Tillmann (Germany) | 2–0 | (Argentina) Churin – Abdala | Court 3 Referees: Suzanne Lowry (USA), Giuseppe Curto (ITA) |
| 15 November 2025; 13:00 | (21–18, 21–11); Report | | | Court 3 Referees: Suzanne Lowry (USA), Giuseppe Curto (ITA) |

| 15 November 2025; 14:00 | Bock – Lippmann (Germany) | 2–0 | (Puerto Rico) González – Navas | Court 3 Referees: Juan Carlos Saavedra (COL), Giovanni Bake (RSA) |
| 15 November 2025; 14:00 | (21–13, 21–18); Report | | | Court 3 Referees: Juan Carlos Saavedra (COL), Giovanni Bake (RSA) |

| 16 November 2025; 18:00 | Müller – Tillmann (Germany) | 2–1 | (Puerto Rico) González – Navas | Court 3 Referees: Giuseppe Curto (ITA), Wang Lijun (CHN) |
| 16 November 2025; 18:00 | (17–21, 21–18, 15–9); Report | | | Court 3 Referees: Giuseppe Curto (ITA), Wang Lijun (CHN) |

| 16 November 2025; 19:30 | Bock – Lippmann (Germany) | 2–0 | (Argentina) Churin – Abdala | Court 3 Referees: Agnieszka Myszkowska (POL), Vincent Roche (FRA) |
| 16 November 2025; 19:30 | (21–12, 21–13); Report | | | Court 3 Referees: Agnieszka Myszkowska (POL), Vincent Roche (FRA) |

| 17 November 2025; 15:00 | Müller – Tillmann (Germany) | 1–2 | (Germany) Bock – Lippmann | Central court Referees: Giovanni Bake (RSA), Milan Vachutka (CZE) |
| 17 November 2025; 15:00 | (18–21, 21–14, 14–16); Report | | | Central court Referees: Giovanni Bake (RSA), Milan Vachutka (CZE) |

| 17 November 2025; 17:00 | González – Navas (Puerto Rico) | 2–0 | (Argentina) Churin – Abdala | Central court Referees: Rui Carvalho (POR), Giovanni Bake (RSA) |
| 17 November 2025; 17:00 | (21–15, 21–17); Report | | | Central court Referees: Rui Carvalho (POR), Giovanni Bake (RSA) |

=== Pool I ===
| Pos | Team | Pld | W | L | Pts | SW | SL | SR | SPW | SPL | SPR | Qualification |
|---|---|---|---|---|---|---|---|---|---|---|---|---|
| 1 | (Italy) Gottardi – Orsi Toth | 3 | 2 | 1 | 5 | 5 | 2 | 2.500 | 139 | 115 | 1.209 | Round of 32 |
| 2 | (United States) Donlin – Denaburg | 3 | 2 | 1 | 5 | 4 | 3 | 1.333 | 125 | 116 | 1.078 | Round of 32 |
| 3 | (New Zealand) Polley – MacDonald | 3 | 2 | 1 | 5 | 4 | 4 | 1.000 | 134 | 144 | 0.931 | Round of 32 |
| 4 | (Canada) Monkhouse – Bélanger | 3 | 0 | 3 | 3 | 2 | 6 | 0.333 | 126 | 149 | 0.846 | |

Source: FIVB

| 14 November 2025; 09:00 | Donlin – Denaburg (United States) | 2–0 | (New Zealand) Polley – MacDonald | Central court Referees: José María Padron (ESP), Vincent Roche (FRA) |
| 14 November 2025; 09:00 | (21–17, 21–13); Report | | | Central court Referees: José María Padron (ESP), Vincent Roche (FRA) |

| 14 November 2025; 12:00 | Gottardi – Orsi Toth (Italy) | 2–0 | (Canada) Monkhouse – Bélanger | Court 2 Referees: Giseli Amantino (BRA), Giovanni Bake (RSA) |
| 14 November 2025; 12:00 | (21–18, 21–17); Report | | | Court 2 Referees: Giseli Amantino (BRA), Giovanni Bake (RSA) |

| 16 November 2025; 17:00 | Gottardi – Orsi Toth (Italy) | 1–2 | (New Zealand) Polley – MacDonald | Court 2 Referees: Osvaldo Sumavil (ARG), Rui Carvalho (POR) |
| 16 November 2025; 17:00 | (18–21, 21–13, 16–18); Report | | | Court 2 Referees: Osvaldo Sumavil (ARG), Rui Carvalho (POR) |

| 16 November 2025; 17:00 | Donlin – Denaburg (United States) | 2–1 | (Canada) Monkhouse – Bélanger | Court 3 Referees: Vincent Roche (FRA), Giseli Amantino (BRA) |
| 16 November 2025; 17:00 | (21–16, 19–21, 15–7); Report | | | Court 3 Referees: Vincent Roche (FRA), Giseli Amantino (BRA) |

| 17 November 2025; 19:30 | Gottardi – Orsi Toth (Italy) | 2–0 | (United States) Donlin – Denaburg | Court 3 Referees: Carlos Rivera (PUR), Vincent Roche (FRA) |
| 17 November 2025; 19:30 | (21–16, 21–12); Report | | | Court 3 Referees: Carlos Rivera (PUR), Vincent Roche (FRA) |

| 17 November 2025; 19:30 | Polley – MacDonald (New Zealand) | 2–1 | (Canada) Monkhouse – Bélanger | Court 2 Referees: José María Padron (ESP), Charalampos Papadogoulas (GRE) |
| 17 November 2025; 19:30 | (21–15, 16–21, 15–11); Report | | | Court 2 Referees: José María Padron (ESP), Charalampos Papadogoulas (GRE) |

=== Pool J ===
| Pos | Team | Pld | W | L | Pts | SW | SL | SR | SPW | SPL | SPR | Qualification |
|---|---|---|---|---|---|---|---|---|---|---|---|---|
| 1 | (Canada) Melissa – Brandie | 3 | 3 | 0 | 6 | 6 | 0 | MAX | 130 | 86 | 1.512 | Round of 32 |
| 2 | (Netherlands) Stam – Schoon | 3 | 2 | 1 | 5 | 4 | 2 | 2.000 | 121 | 99 | 1.222 | Round of 32 |
| 3 | (France) Vieira – Chamereau | 3 | 1 | 2 | 4 | 2 | 4 | 0.500 | 107 | 103 | 1.039 | lucky loser |
| 4 | (Morocco) Mahassine – Dina | 3 | 0 | 3 | 3 | 0 | 6 | 0.000 | 56 | 126 | 0.444 | |

Source: FIVB

| 15 November 2025; 15:00 | Melissa – Brandie (Canada) | 2–0 | (Morocco) Mahassine – Dina | Court 3 Referees: Carlos Rivera (PUR), Suzanne Lowry (USA) |
| 15 November 2025; 15:00 | (21–4, 21–9); Report | | | Court 3 Referees: Carlos Rivera (PUR), Suzanne Lowry (USA) |

| 15 November 2025; 18:00 | Vieira – Chamereau (France) | 0–2 | (Netherlands) Stam – Schoon | Court 3 Referees: Suzanne Lowry (USA), Giuseppe Curto (ITA) |
| 15 November 2025; 18:00 | (14–21, 15–21); Report | | | Court 3 Referees: Suzanne Lowry (USA), Giuseppe Curto (ITA) |

| 16 November 2025; 19:30 | Melissa – Brandie (Canada) | 2–0 | (Netherlands) Stam – Schoon | Court 2 Referees: Suzanne Lowry (USA), Osvaldo Sumavil (ARG) |
| 16 November 2025; 19:30 | (21–15, 24–22); Report | | | Court 2 Referees: Suzanne Lowry (USA), Osvaldo Sumavil (ARG) |

| 16 November 2025; 20:30 | Vieira – Chamereau (France) | 2–0 | (Morocco) Mahassine – Dina | Court 3 Referees: Giseli Amantino (BRA), Giuseppe Curto (ITA) |
| 16 November 2025; 20:30 | (21–7, 21–10); Report | | | Court 3 Referees: Giseli Amantino (BRA), Giuseppe Curto (ITA) |

| 17 November 2025; 21:00 | Melissa – Brandie (Canada) | 2–0 | (France) Vieira – Chamereau | Central court Referees: Milan Vachutka (CZE), Rui Carvalho (POR) |
| 17 November 2025; 21:00 | (21–16, 22–20); Report | | | Central court Referees: Milan Vachutka (CZE), Rui Carvalho (POR) |

| 17 November 2025; 21:30 | Stam – Schoon (Netherlands) | 2–0 | (Morocco) Mahassine – Dina | Court 3 Referees: Tim Cleaver (NZL), Carlos Rivera (PUR) |
| 17 November 2025; 21:30 | (21–13, 21–12); Report | | | Court 3 Referees: Tim Cleaver (NZL), Carlos Rivera (PUR) |

=== Pool K ===
| Pos | Team | Pld | W | L | Pts | SW | SL | SR | SPW | SPL | SPR | Qualification |
|---|---|---|---|---|---|---|---|---|---|---|---|---|
| 1 | (Switzerland) Anouk – Zoé | 3 | 3 | 0 | 6 | 6 | 0 | MAX | 127 | 95 | 1.337 | Round of 32 |
| 2 | (Austria) D. Klinger – R. Klinger | 3 | 2 | 1 | 5 | 4 | 2 | 2.000 | 121 | 97 | 1.247 | Round of 32 |
| 3 | (Australia) Alchin – Johnson | 3 | 1 | 2 | 4 | 2 | 4 | 0.500 | 108 | 109 | 0.991 | lucky loser |
| 4 | (Dominican Republic) Paniagua – Payano | 3 | 0 | 3 | 3 | 0 | 6 | 0.000 | 71 | 126 | 0.563 | |

Source: FIVB

| 14 November 2025; 11:00 | Anouk – Zoé (Switzerland) | 2–0 | (Dominican Republic) Paniagua – Payano | Court 3 Referees: Tim Cleaver (NZL), Brian Hiebert (CAN) |
| 14 November 2025; 11:00 | (21–14, 21–12); Report | | | Court 3 Referees: Tim Cleaver (NZL), Brian Hiebert (CAN) |

| 14 November 2025; 15:00 | D. Klinger – R. Klinger (Austria) | 2–0 | (Australia) Alchin – Johnson | Court 2 Referees: Giovanni Bake (RSA), Agnieszka Myszkowska (POL) |
| 14 November 2025; 15:00 | (21–16, 21–18); Report | | | Court 2 Referees: Giovanni Bake (RSA), Agnieszka Myszkowska (POL) |

| 15 November 2025; 19:30 | D. Klinger – R. Klinger (Austria) | 2–0 | (Dominican Republic) Paniagua – Payano | Court 3 Referees: Juan Carlos Saavedra (COL), Giovanni Bake (RSA) |
| 15 November 2025; 19:30 | (21–9, 21–11); Report | | | Court 3 Referees: Juan Carlos Saavedra (COL), Giovanni Bake (RSA) |

| 15 November 2025; 20:30 | Anouk – Zoé (Switzerland) | 2–0 | (Australia) Alchin – Johnson | Court 3 Referees: Carlos Rivera (PUR), Suzanne Lowry (USA) |
| 15 November 2025; 20:30 | (21–14, 21–18); Report | | | Court 3 Referees: Carlos Rivera (PUR), Suzanne Lowry (USA) |

| 17 November 2025; 20:00 | Alchin – Johnson (Australia) | 2–0 | (Dominican Republic) Paniagua – Payano | Central court Referees: Osvaldo Sumavil (ARG), Wang Lijun (CHN) |
| 17 November 2025; 20:00 | (21–14, 21–11); Report | | | Central court Referees: Osvaldo Sumavil (ARG), Wang Lijun (CHN) |

| 17 November 2025; 21:30 | Anouk – Zoé (Switzerland) | 2–0 | (Austria) D. Klinger – R. Klinger | Court 2 Referees: Suzanne Lowry (USA), José María Padron (ESP) |
| 17 November 2025; 21:30 | (21–17, 22–20); Report | | | Court 2 Referees: Suzanne Lowry (USA), José María Padron (ESP) |

=== Pool L ===
| Pos | Team | Pld | W | L | Pts | SW | SL | SR | SPW | SPL | SPR | Qualification |
|---|---|---|---|---|---|---|---|---|---|---|---|---|
| 1 | (Germany) Paul – Kunst | 3 | 3 | 0 | 6 | 6 | 3 | 2.000 | 158 | 143 | 1.105 | Round of 32 |
| 2 | (China) Wang – Xia | 3 | 2 | 1 | 5 | 5 | 3 | 1.667 | 145 | 120 | 1.208 | Round of 32 |
| 3 | (Switzerland) Niederhauser – Kernen | 3 | 1 | 2 | 4 | 4 | 4 | 1.000 | 134 | 134 | 1.000 | Round of 32 |
| 4 | (Australia) Clancy – Milutinovic | 3 | 0 | 3 | 3 | 1 | 6 | 0.167 | 103 | 143 | 0.720 | |

Source: FIVB

| 14 November 2025; 19:30 | Niederhauser – Kernen (Switzerland) | 1–2 | (Germany) Paul – Kunst | Court 2 Referees: Milan Vachutka (CZE), Giseli Amantino (BRA) |
| 14 November 2025; 19:30 | (21–11, 18–21, 11–15); Report | | | Court 2 Referees: Milan Vachutka (CZE), Giseli Amantino (BRA) |

| 14 November 2025; 20:00 | Clancy – Milutinovic (Australia) | 0–2 | (China) Wang – Xia | Central court Referees: Carlos Rivera (PUR), José María Padron (ESP) |
| 14 November 2025; 20:00 | (15–21, 11–21); Report | | | Central court Referees: Carlos Rivera (PUR), José María Padron (ESP) |

| 15 November 2025; 19:30 | Niederhauser – Kernen (Switzerland) | 1–2 | (China) Wang – Xia | Court 2 Referees: Osvaldo Sumavil (ARG), Charalampos Papadogoulas (GRE) |
| 15 November 2025; 19:30 | (21–19, 12–21, 9–15); Report | | | Court 2 Referees: Osvaldo Sumavil (ARG), Charalampos Papadogoulas (GRE) |

| 15 November 2025; 22:00 | Clancy – Milutinovic (Australia) | 1–2 | (Germany) Paul – Kunst | Central court Referees: Wang Lijun (CHN), Milan Vachutka (CZE) |
| 15 November 2025; 22:00 | (14–21, 25–23, 6–15); Report | | | Central court Referees: Wang Lijun (CHN), Milan Vachutka (CZE) |

| 16 November 2025; 20:00 | Clancy – Milutinovic (Australia) | 0–2 | (Switzerland) Niederhauser – Kernen | Central court Referees: Juan Carlos Saavedra (COL), José María Padron (ESP) |
| 16 November 2025; 20:00 | (13–21, 19–21); Report | | | Central court Referees: Juan Carlos Saavedra (COL), José María Padron (ESP) |

| 16 November 2025; 20:30 | Paul – Kunst (Germany) | 2–1 | (China) Wang – Xia | Court 2 Referees: Rui Carvalho (POR), Milan Vachutka (CZE) |
| 16 November 2025; 20:30 | (16–21, 21–18, 15–9); Report | | | Court 2 Referees: Rui Carvalho (POR), Milan Vachutka (CZE) |

=== Ranking of third-placed teams ===
| Pos | Grp | Team | Pld | W | L | Pts | SW | SL | SR | SPW | SPL | SPR | Qualification |
|---|---|---|---|---|---|---|---|---|---|---|---|---|---|
| 1 | I | (New Zealand) Polley – MacDonald | 3 | 2 | 1 | 5 | 4 | 4 | 1.000 | 136 | 144 | 0.944 | Round of 32 |
| 2 | L | (Switzerland) Niederhauser – Kernen | 3 | 1 | 2 | 4 | 4 | 4 | 1.000 | 134 | 134 | 1.000 | Round of 32 |
| 3 | H | (Puerto Rico) González – Navas | 3 | 1 | 2 | 4 | 3 | 4 | 0.750 | 121 | 127 | 0.953 | Round of 32 |
| 4 | B | (Netherlands) Konink – Poiesz | 3 | 1 | 2 | 4 | 3 | 4 | 0.750 | 106 | 123 | 0.862 | Round of 32 |
| 5 | J | (France) Vieira – Chamereau | 3 | 1 | 2 | 4 | 2 | 4 | 0.500 | 107 | 102 | 1.049 | Lucky losers playoffs |
| 6 | K | (Australia) Alchin – Johnson | 3 | 1 | 2 | 4 | 2 | 4 | 0.500 | 108 | 109 | 0.991 | Lucky losers playoffs |
| 7 | D | (France) Placette – Richard | 3 | 1 | 2 | 4 | 2 | 4 | 0.500 | 113 | 118 | 0.958 | Lucky losers playoffs |
| 8 | C | (Czech Republic) Kylie – Maixnerová | 3 | 1 | 2 | 4 | 2 | 4 | 0.500 | 99 | 108 | 0.917 | Lucky losers playoffs |
| 9 | A | (Paraguay) Michelle – Corrales | 3 | 1 | 2 | 4 | 2 | 4 | 0.500 | 104 | 118 | 0.881 | Lucky losers playoffs |
| 10 | F | (Australia) Phillips – Mears | 3 | 1 | 2 | 4 | 2 | 4 | 0.500 | 101 | 123 | 0.821 | Lucky losers playoffs |
| 11 | G | (Australia) Fleming – Fejes | 3 | 1 | 2 | 4 | 2 | 5 | 0.400 | 135 | 144 | 0.938 | Lucky losers playoffs |
| 12 | E | (Italy) Scampoli – Bianchi | 3 | 1 | 2 | 4 | 2 | 5 | 0.400 | 125 | 134 | 0.933 | Lucky losers playoffs |

Source: FIVB

=== Lucky losers playoffs ===
| 18 November 2025; 13:30 | Alchin – Johnson (Australia) | 1–2 | (Australia) Fleming – Fejes | Central court Referees: Wang Lijun (CHN), Giuseppe Curto (ITA) |
| 18 November 2025; 13:30 | (21–19, 17–21, 12–15); Report | | | Central court Referees: Wang Lijun (CHN), Giuseppe Curto (ITA) |

| 18 November 2025; 14:30 | Placette – Richard (France) | 2–0 | (Australia) Phillips – Mears | Central court Referees: Giseli Amantino (BRA), José María Padron (ESP) |
| 18 November 2025; 14:30 | (21–12, 21–14); Report | | | Central court Referees: Giseli Amantino (BRA), José María Padron (ESP) |

| 18 November 2025; 15:30 | Vieira – Chamereau (France) | 0–2 | (Italy) Scampoli – Bianchi | Court 2 Referees: Tim Cleaver (NZL), Agnieszka Myszkowska (POL) |
| 18 November 2025; 15:30 | (12–21, 20–22); Report | | | Court 2 Referees: Tim Cleaver (NZL), Agnieszka Myszkowska (POL) |

| 18 November 2025; 15:30 | Kylie – Maixnerová (Czech Republic) | 2–0 | (Paraguay) Michelle – Corrales | Court 3 Referees: Giovanni Bake (RSA), Giuseppe Curto (ITA) |
| 18 November 2025; 15:30 | (18–21, 21–16, 15–8); Report | | | Court 3 Referees: Giovanni Bake (RSA), Giuseppe Curto (ITA) |

== Knockout stage ==
=== Bracket ===
Round of 32
19 November
(Brazil) Thamela – Victória | 2
(France) Placette – Richard | 1
19 November
(Japan) Shiba – Murakami | 0
(Ukraine) Lazarenko – Romaniuk | 2
18 November
(Italy) Gottardi – Orsi Toth | 2
(Germany) Müller – Tillmann | 0
18 November
(New Zealand) Polley – MacDonald | 0
(Germany) Bock – Lippmann | 2
18 November
(Latvia) Tīna – Anastasija | 2
(Netherlands) Konink – Poiesz | 0
18 November
(Netherlands) Van Driel – Bekhuis | 0
(Germany) Paul – Kunst | 2
19 November
(Austria) D. Klinger – R. Klinger | 0
(United States) Shaw – Cheng | 2
19 November
(United States) Cannon – Kraft | 0
(Czech Republic) Kylie – Maixnerová | 2
19 November
(United States) Nuss – Brasher | 2
(Italy) Scampoli – Bianchi | 0
19 November
(Netherlands) Stam – Schoon | 2
(China) Wang – Xia | 0
18 November
(Switzerland) Anouk – Zoé | 1
(United States) Donlin – Denaburg | 2
18 November
(Puerto Rico) González – Navas | 0
(Brazil) Ana Patrícia – Duda | 2
18 November
(Spain) Dani – Moreno | 2
(Switzerland) Niederhauser – Kernen | 1
18 November
(Ukraine) Davidova – Khmil | 0
(Canada) Melissa – Brandie | 2
19 November
(Germany) Ittlinger – Grüne | 2
(Czech Republic) Svozilová – Štochlová | 1
19 November
(Brazil) Carol – Rebecca | 2
(Australia) Fleming – Fejes | 0

Round of 16
20 November
(Brazil) Thamela – Victória | 2
(Ukraine) Lazarenko – Romaniuk | 1
20 November
(Italy) Gottardi – Orsi Toth | 2
(Germany) Bock – Lippmann | 0
20 November
(Latvia) Tīna – Anastasija | 2
(Germany) Paul – Kunst | 0
20 November
(United States) Shaw – Cheng | 2
(Czech Republic) Kylie – Maixnerová | 0
20 November
(United States) Nuss – Brasher | 2
(Netherlands) Stam – Schoon | 1
20 November
(United States) Donlin – Denaburg | w/o
(Brazil) Ana Patrícia – Duda
20 November
(Spain) Dani – Moreno | 0
(Canada) Melissa – Brandie | 2
20 November
(Germany) Ittlinger – Grüne | 0
(Brazil) Carol – Rebecca | 2

Quarter-finals
21 November
(Brazil) Thamela – Victória | 2
(Italy) Gottardi – Orsi Toth | 0
21 November
(Latvia) Tīna – Anastasija | 2
(United States) Shaw – Cheng | 0
21 November
(United States) Nuss – Brasher | 2
(United States) Donlin – Denaburg | 0
21 November
(Canada) Melissa – Brandie | 1
(Brazil) Carol – Rebecca | 2

Semi-finals
22 November
(Brazil) Thamela – Victória | 0
(Latvia) Tīna – Anastasija | 2
22 November
(United States) Nuss – Brasher | 2
(Brazil) Carol – Rebecca | 1

Final
23 November
(Latvia) Tīna – Anastasija | 2
(United States) Nuss – Brasher | 1
Third place
23 November
(Brazil) Thamela – Victória | 0
(Brazil) Carol – Rebecca | 2

=== Round of 32 ===
| 18 November 2025; 16:30 | Van Driel – Bekhuis (Netherlands) | 0–2 | (Germany) Paul – Kunst | Court 3 Referees: Juan Carlos Saavedra (COL), Carlos Rivera (PUR) |
| 18 November 2025; 16:30 | (17–21, 19–21); Report | | | Court 3 Referees: Juan Carlos Saavedra (COL), Carlos Rivera (PUR) |

| 18 November 2025; 16:30 | González – Navas (Puerto Rico) | 0–2 | (Brazil) Ana Patrícia – Duda | Court 2 Referees: Vincent Roche (FRA), Charalampos Papadogoulas (GRE) |
| 18 November 2025; 16:30 | (22–24, 19–21); Report | | | Court 2 Referees: Vincent Roche (FRA), Charalampos Papadogoulas (GRE) |

| 18 November 2025; 17:30 | Gottardi – Orsi Toth (Italy) | 2–0 | (Germany) Müller – Tillmann | Court 3 Referees: Suzanne Lowry (USA), Giovanni Bake (RSA) |
| 18 November 2025; 17:30 | (21–12, 25–23); Report | | | Court 3 Referees: Suzanne Lowry (USA), Giovanni Bake (RSA) |

| 18 November 2025; 19:00 | Polley – MacDonald (New Zealand) | 0–2 | (Germany) Bock – Lippmann | Court 3 Referees: Agnieszka Myszkowska (POL), Wang Lijun (CHN) |
| 18 November 2025; 19:00 | (15–21, 21–23); Report | | | Court 3 Referees: Agnieszka Myszkowska (POL), Wang Lijun (CHN) |

| 18 November 2025; 20:00 | Tīna – Anastasija (Latvia) | 2–0 | (Netherlands) Konink – Poiesz | Court 3 Referees: Rui Carvalho (POR), Vincent Roche (FRA) |
| 18 November 2025; 20:00 | (21–9, 21–11); Report | | | Court 3 Referees: Rui Carvalho (POR), Vincent Roche (FRA) |

| 18 November 2025; 21:00 | Dani – Moreno (Spain) | 2–1 | (Switzerland) Niederhauser – Kernen | Central court Referees: Tim Cleaver (NZL), Giovanni Bake (RSA) |
| 18 November 2025; 21:00 | (16–21, 21–16, 15–11); Report | | | Central court Referees: Tim Cleaver (NZL), Giovanni Bake (RSA) |

| 18 November 2025; 21:00 | Anouk – Zoé (Switzerland) | 1–2 | (United States) Donlin – Denaburg | Court 2 Referees: Wang Lijun (CHN), Carlos Rivera (PUR) |
| 18 November 2025; 21:00 | (21–16, 16–21, 11–15); Report | | | Court 2 Referees: Wang Lijun (CHN), Carlos Rivera (PUR) |

| 18 November 2025; 22:00 | Davidova – Khmil (Ukraine) | 0–2 | (Canada) Melissa – Brandie | Central court Referees: Suzanne Lowry (USA), Giuseppe Curto (ITA) |
| 18 November 2025; 22:00 | (18–21, 12–21); Report | | | Central court Referees: Suzanne Lowry (USA), Giuseppe Curto (ITA) |

| 19 November 2025; 13:30 | Cannon – Kraft (United States) | 0–2 | (Czech Republic) Kylie – Maixnerová | Court 2 Referees: Giuseppe Curto (ITA), Vincent Roche (FRA) |
| 19 November 2025; 13:30 | (12–21, 14–21); Report | | | Court 2 Referees: Giuseppe Curto (ITA), Vincent Roche (FRA) |

| 19 November 2025; 14:30 | Thamela – Victória (Brazil) | 2–1 | (France) Placette – Richard | Central court Referees: Giovanni Bake (RSA), Agnieszka Myszkowska (POL) |
| 19 November 2025; 14:30 | (21–17, 15–21, 19–17); Report | | | Central court Referees: Giovanni Bake (RSA), Agnieszka Myszkowska (POL) |

| 19 November 2025; 15:30 | Ittlinger – Grüne (Germany) | 2–1 | (Czech Republic) Svozilová – Štochlová | Central court Referees: Juan Carlos Saavedra (COL), Osvaldo Sumavil (ARG) |
| 19 November 2025; 15:30 | (16–21, 21–18, 15–11); Report | | | Central court Referees: Juan Carlos Saavedra (COL), Osvaldo Sumavil (ARG) |

| 19 November 2025; 17:00 | Shiba – Murakami (Japan) | 0–2 | (Ukraine) Lazarenko – Romaniuk | Court 2 Referees: Vincent Roche (FRA), Tim Cleaver (NZL) |
| 19 November 2025; 17:00 | (19–21, 20–22); Report | | | Court 2 Referees: Vincent Roche (FRA), Tim Cleaver (NZL) |

| 19 November 2025; 18:30 | D. Klinger – R. Klinger (Austria) | 0–2 | (United States) Shaw – Cheng | Court 2 Referees: Agnieszka Myszkowska (POL), Giovanni Bake (RSA) |
| 19 November 2025; 18:30 | (19–21, 19–21); Report | | | Court 2 Referees: Agnieszka Myszkowska (POL), Giovanni Bake (RSA) |

| 19 November 2025; 19:00 | Carol – Rebecca (Brazil) | 2–0 | (Australia) Fleming – Fejes | Central court Referees: Wang Lijun (CHN), Rui Carvalho (POR) |
| 19 November 2025; 19:00 | (21–14, 21–18); Report | | | Central court Referees: Wang Lijun (CHN), Rui Carvalho (POR) |

| 19 November 2025; 21:00 | Stam – Schoon (Netherlands) | 2–0 | (China) Wang – Xia | Court 2 Referees: Giseli Amantino (BRA), Tim Cleaver (NZL) |
| 19 November 2025; 21:00 | (21–15, 21–13); Report | | | Court 2 Referees: Giseli Amantino (BRA), Tim Cleaver (NZL) |

| 19 November 2025; 22:00 | Nuss – Brasher (United States) | 2–0 | (Italy) Scampoli – Bianchi | Central court Referees: Rui Carvalho (POR), Juan Carlos Saavedra (COL) |
| 19 November 2025; 22:00 | (21–14, 21–19); Report | | | Central court Referees: Rui Carvalho (POR), Juan Carlos Saavedra (COL) |

=== Round of 16 ===
| 20 November 2025; 13:30 | Thamela – Victória (Brazil) | 2–1 | (Ukraine) Lazarenko – Romaniuk | Central court Referees: Suzanne Lowry (USA), Osvaldo Sumavil (ARG) |
| 20 November 2025; 13:30 | (21–18, 11–21, 15–8); Report | | | Central court Referees: Suzanne Lowry (USA), Osvaldo Sumavil (ARG) |

| 20 November 2025; 14:30 | Donlin – Denaburg (United States) | 2–0 | (Brazil) Ana Patrícia – Duda | Central court Referees: Tim Cleaver (NZL), Brian Hiebert (CAN) |
| 20 November 2025; 14:30 | (w/o); Report | | | Central court Referees: Tim Cleaver (NZL), Brian Hiebert (CAN) |

| 20 November 2025; 16:00 | Gottardi – Orsi Toth (Italy) | 2–0 | (Germany) Bock – Lippmann | Court 2 Referees: Wang Lijun (CHN), Vincent Roche (FRA) |
| 20 November 2025; 16:00 | (21–18, 21–14); Report | | | Court 2 Referees: Wang Lijun (CHN), Vincent Roche (FRA) |

| 20 November 2025; 17:00 | Nuss – Brasher (United States) | 2–1 | (Netherlands) Stam – Schoon | Court 2 Referees: Agnieszka Myszkowska (POL), Carlos Rivera (PUR) |
| 20 November 2025; 17:00 | (20–22, 21–19, 15–6); Report | | | Court 2 Referees: Agnieszka Myszkowska (POL), Carlos Rivera (PUR) |

| 20 November 2025; 19:00 | Ittlinger – Grüne (Germany) | 0–2 | (Brazil) Carol – Rebecca | Central court Referees: Rui Carvalho (POR), José María Padron (ESP) |
| 20 November 2025; 19:00 | (17–21, 18–21); Report | | | Central court Referees: Rui Carvalho (POR), José María Padron (ESP) |

| 20 November 2025; 20:00 | Dani – Moreno (Spain) | 0–2 | (Canada) Melissa – Brandie | Central court Referees: Giovanni Bake (RSA), Giseli Amantino (BRA) |
| 20 November 2025; 20:00 | (15–21, 11–21); Report | | | Central court Referees: Giovanni Bake (RSA), Giseli Amantino (BRA) |

| 20 November 2025; 21:00 | Shaw – Cheng (United States) | 2–0 | (Czech Republic) Kylie – Maixnerová | Court 2 Referees: Vincent Roche (FRA), Agnieszka Myszkowska (POL) |
| 20 November 2025; 21:00 | (21–13, 21–10); Report | | | Court 2 Referees: Vincent Roche (FRA), Agnieszka Myszkowska (POL) |

| 20 November 2025; 22:00 | Tīna – Anastasija (Latvia) | 2–0 | (Germany) Paul – Kunst | Court 2 Referees: Milan Vachutka (CZE), Giuseppe Curto (ITA) |
| 20 November 2025; 22:00 | (21–16, 21–16); Report | | | Court 2 Referees: Milan Vachutka (CZE), Giuseppe Curto (ITA) |

=== Quarterfinals ===
| 21 November 2025; 14:30 | Thamela – Victória (Brazil) | 2–0 | (Italy) Gottardi – Orsi Toth | Central court Referees: Suzanne Lowry (USA), Rui Carvalho (POR) |
| 21 November 2025; 14:30 | (21–16, 21–19); Report | | | Central court Referees: Suzanne Lowry (USA), Rui Carvalho (POR) |

| 21 November 2025; 15:30 | Tīna – Anastasija (Latvia) | 2–0 | (United States) Shaw – Cheng | Central court Referees: José María Padron (ESP), Wang Lijun (CHN) |
| 21 November 2025; 15:30 | (21–18, 21–17); Report | | | Central court Referees: José María Padron (ESP), Wang Lijun (CHN) |

| 21 November 2025; 21:20 | Melissa – Brandie (Canada) | 1–2 | (Brazil) Carol – Rebecca | Central court Referees: Agnieszka Myszkowska (POL), José María Padron (ESP) |
| 21 November 2025; 21:20 | (17–21, 21–18, 9–15); Report | | | Central court Referees: Agnieszka Myszkowska (POL), José María Padron (ESP) |

| 21 November 2025; 22:20 | Nuss – Brasher (United States) | 2–0 | (United States) Donlin – Denaburg | Central court Referees: Giseli Amantino (BRA), Juan Carlos Saavedra (COL) |
| 21 November 2025; 22:20 | (22–20, 21–18); Report | | | Central court Referees: Giseli Amantino (BRA), Juan Carlos Saavedra (COL) |

=== Semifinals ===
| 22 November 2025; 16:00 | Thamela – Victória (Brazil) | 0–2 | (Latvia) Tīna – Anastasija | Central court Referees: Wang Lijun (CHN), Osvaldo Sumavil (ARG) |
| 22 November 2025; 16:00 | (10–21, 16–21); Report | | | Central court Referees: Wang Lijun (CHN), Osvaldo Sumavil (ARG) |

| 22 November 2025; 20:00 | Nuss – Brasher (United States) | 2–1 | (Brazil) Carol – Rebecca | Central court Referees: Charalampos Papadogoulas (GRE), Agnieszka Myszkowska (POL) |
| 22 November 2025; 20:00 | (19–21, 24–22, 15–6); Report | | | Central court Referees: Charalampos Papadogoulas (GRE), Agnieszka Myszkowska (POL) |

=== Third place game ===
| 23 November 2025; 16:00 | Thamela – Victória (Brazil) | 0–2 | (Brazil) Carol – Rebecca | Central court Referees: José María Padron (ESP), Suzanne Lowry (USA) |
| 23 November 2025; 16:00 | (18–21, 20–22); Report | | | Central court Referees: José María Padron (ESP), Suzanne Lowry (USA) |

=== Final ===
| 23 November 2025; 20:00 | Tīna – Anastasija (Latvia) | 2–1 | (United States) Nuss – Brasher | Central court Referees: Giseli Amantino (BRA), Charalampos Papadogoulas (GRE) |
| 23 November 2025; 20:00 | (21–15, 15–21, 15–11); Report | | | Central court Referees: Giseli Amantino (BRA), Charalampos Papadogoulas (GRE) |

== Final ranking ==
| Rank | Team |
|---|---|
| Gold medal | (Latvia) Tīna – Anastasija |
| Silver medal | (United States) Nuss – Brasher |
| Bronze medal | (Brazil) Carol – Rebecca |
| 4 | (Brazil) Thamela – Victória |
| 5 | (United States) Donlin – Denaburg |
| 5 | (Canada) Melissa – Brandie |
| 5 | (Italy) Gottardi – Orsi Toth |
| 5 | (United States) Shaw – Cheng |
| 9 | (Brazil) Ana Patrícia – Duda |
| 9 | (Czech Republic) Kylie – Maixnerová |
| 9 | (Germany) Bock – Lippmann |
| 9 | (Germany) Ittlinger – Grüne |
| 9 | (Germany) Paul – Kunst |
| 9 | (Netherlands) Stam – Schoon |
| 9 | (Spain) Dani – Moreno |
| 9 | (Ukraine) Lazarenko – Romaniuk |
| 17 | (Australia) Fleming – Fejes |
| 17 | (Austria) D. Klinger – R. Klinger |
| 17 | (China) Wang – Xia |
| 17 | (Czech Republic) Svozilová – Štochlová |
| 17 | (France) Placette – Richard |
| 17 | (Germany) Müller – Tillmann |
| 17 | (Italy) Scampoli – Bianchi |
| 17 | (Japan) Shiba – Murakami |
| 17 | (Netherlands) Van Driel – Bekhuis |
| 17 | (Netherlands) Konink – Poiesz |
| 17 | (New Zealand) Polley – MacDonald |
| 17 | (Puerto Rico) González – Navas |
| 17 | (Switzerland) Anouk – Zoé |
| 17 | (Switzerland) Niederhauser – Kernen |
| 17 | (United States) Cannon – Kraft |
| 17 | (Ukraine) Davidova – Khmil |
| 33 | (Australia) Alchin – Johnson |
| 33 | (Australia) Phillips – Mears |
| 33 | (France) Vieira – Chamereau |
| 33 | (Paraguay) Michelle – Corrales |
| 37 | (Argentina) Churin – Abdala |
| 37 | (Australia) Clancy – Milutinovic |
| 37 | (Brazil) Vitória – Hegeile |
| 37 | (Canada) Monkhouse – Bélanger |
| 37 | (Dominican Republic) Paniagua – Payano |
| 37 | (Egypt) Marwa – Nada |
| 37 | (Lithuania) Paulikienė – Raupelytė |
| 37 | (Morocco) Mahassine – Dina |
| 37 | (Mexico) Torres – Gutiérrez |
| 37 | (Mozambique) Vanessa – Mucheza |
| 37 | (Peru) Gaona – Allcca |
| 37 | (Poland) Okla – Łunio |

== See also ==
- 2025 Beach Volleyball World Championships – Men's tournament
