= 2025 U Sports Men's Basketball Championship =

Canadian university basketball championship

- Season: 2024–25
- Teams: Eight
- Finals site: Doug Mitchell Thunderbird Sports Centre; UBC War Memorial Gymnasium; Vancouver, British Columbia
- Champions: Victoria Vikes (9th title)
- Runner-up: Calgary Dinos
- Winning coach: Murphy Burnatowski (1st title)
- Tournament MVP: Sam Maillet (Victoria)
- Television: CBC

The 2025 U Sports Men's Final 8 Basketball Tournament was held March 13–16, 2025, in Vancouver, British Columbia, to determine a national champion for the 2024–25 U Sports men's basketball season. The fourth-seeded Victoria Vikes defeated the second-seeded Calgary Dinos in a dominant 82–53 victory to win the program's ninth national championship.

== Host ==
The tournament was hosted by the University of British Columbia at the school's Doug Mitchell Thunderbird Sports Centre and UBC War Memorial Gymnasium. It took place at the same time as the 2025 U Sports Women's Basketball Championship, necessitating the need for two venues, which was also the first time in U Sports history that both tournaments were hosted by one school in the same year. This was the third time that UBC has hosted the tournament with the first taking place in 1972 and the most recent taking place in 2016.

== Participating teams ==
The seeding for teams was announced on March 9, 2025, with the Concordia Stingers being awarded the at-large berth.

| Seed | Team | Qualified | Record | Last | Total |
|---|---|---|---|---|---|
| 1 | Ottawa Gee-Gees | OUA Champion | 20–2 | None | 0 |
| 2 | Calgary Dinos | Canada West Champion | 16–4 | 2018 | 1 |
| 3 | UBC Thunderbirds | Canada West Finalist (Host) | 15–5 | 1972 | 2 |
| 4 | Victoria Vikes | Canada West Bronze | 20–0 | 1997 | 8 |
| 5 | Bishop's Gaiters | RSEQ Champion | 11–5 | 1998 | 1 |
| 6 | UPEI Panthers | AUS Champion | 11–9 | None | 0 |
| 7 | Queen's Gaels | OUA Finalist | 16–6 | None | 0 |
| 8 | Concordia Stingers | RSEQ Finalist (At-large berth) | 14–2 | 1990 | 1 |

== Championship bracket ==
First Round: March 13
1 | Ottawa Gee-Gees | 79
8 | Concordia Stingers | 69
4 | Victoria Vikes | 85
5 | Bishop's Gaiters | 73
2 | Calgary Dinos | 109
7 | Queen's Gaels | 98
3 | UBC Thunderbirds | 72
6 | UPEI Panthers | 90

Semi-Finals: March 14
1 | Ottawa Gee-Gees | 75
4 | Victoria Vikes | 89
2 | Calgary Dinos | 87
6 | UPEI Panthers | 54

Gold Medal Game: March 16
2 | Calgary Dinos | 53
4 | Victoria Vikes | 82
Bronze Medal Game: March 16
1 | Ottawa Gee-Gees | 86
6 | UPEI Panthers | 70

== Consolation bracket ==
Semi-Finals: March 14
5 | Bishop's Gaiters | 66
8 | Concordia Stingers | 81
3 | UBC Thunderbirds | 107
7 | Queen's Gaels | 98

Fifth Place Game: March 15
3 | UBC Thunderbirds | 80
8 | Concordia Stingers | 87
