= 2010 CIS Women's Volleyball Championship =

- Season: 2009–10
- Teams: Eight
- Finals site: Main Gym; Edmonton, Alberta
- Champions: UBC Thunderbirds (7th title)
- Runner-up: Manitoba Bisons
- Winning coach: Doug Reimer (4th title)
- Championship MVP: Liz Cordonier (UBC Thunderbirds)

The 2010 CIS Women's Volleyball Championship was held March 5, 2010 to March 7, 2010, in Edmonton, Alberta, to determine a national champion for the 2009–10 CIS women's volleyball season. The tournament was played at the University of Alberta's Main Gym. It was the fifth time that the University of Alberta had hosted the tournament with the first four taking place over a five-year span from 1995 to 1999.

The top-seeded UBC Thunderbirds won their third consecutive national championship and completed an undefeated season following their victory over the Manitoba Bisons. The Thunderbirds finished the season with a 27–0 record against CIS opponents and became the fifth team to win three straight gold medals. This was the first time that UBC and Manitoba had faced each other in the gold medal match, with both programs entering the game having won six national championships. With the victory, the Thunderbirds tied a CIS record with their seventh championship win in program history, which had also been accomplished by the Winnipeg Wesmen and Alberta Pandas.

The 2009–10 Thunderbirds volleyball team was inducted into the UBC Sports Hall of Fame in 2017.

== Participating teams ==
Seed	Team	Qualified	Record	Last	Total
1	UBC Thunderbirds	Canada West Champion	20–0	2009	6
2	Montreal Carabins	RSEQ Champion	20–0	None	0
3	Manitoba Bisons	Canada West Finalist	15–5	2002	6
4	Regina Cougars	Canada West Bronze	13–7	None	0
5	Laval Rouge et Or	RSEQ Finalist	13–7	2006	1
6	Toronto Varsity Blues	OUA Champion	14–5	None	0
7	Alberta Pandas	Canada West Quarter-Finalist (Host)	12–8	2007	7
8	Saint Mary's Huskies	AUS Champion	11–7	None	0

== Championship bracket ==
First Round: March 5
1	UBC Thunderbirds	3
8	Saint Mary's Huskies	0
4	Regina Cougars	0
5	Laval Rouge et Or	3
2	Montreal Carabins	0
7	Alberta Pandas	3
3	Manitoba Bisons	3
6	Toronto Varsity Blues	0

Semi-Finals: March 6
1	UBC Thunderbirds	3
5	Laval Rouge et Or	0
7	Alberta Pandas	1
3	Manitoba Bisons	3

Gold Medal Game: March 7
1	UBC Thunderbirds	3
3	Manitoba Bisons	1
Bronze Medal Game: March 7
5	Laval Rouge et Or	3
7	Alberta Pandas	1

== Consolation bracket ==
Semi-Finals: March 6
4	Regina Cougars	3
8	Saint Mary's Huskies	0
2	Montreal Carabins	2
6	Toronto Varsity Blues	3

Fifth Place Game: March 7
4	Regina Cougars	3
6	Toronto Varsity Blues	0

== Awards ==
=== Championship awards ===
- CIS Tournament MVP – Liz Cordonier, UBC
- R.W. Pugh Fair Play Award – Sarah Létourneau-Lévesque, Laval

=== All-Star Team ===
- Ève Trepanier, Laval
- Tricia Mayba, Manitoba
- Jen Hinze, UBC
- Ashley Voth, Manitoba
- Liz Cordonier, UBC
- Shanice Marcelle, UBC
- Tiffany Proudfoot, Alberta
