= 2024 U Sports Women's Volleyball Championship =

Canadian university volleyball championship

- Season: 2023–24
- Teams: Eight
- Finals site: Burridge Gymnasium; Hamilton, Ontario
- Champions: UBC Thunderbirds (14th title)
- Runner-up: Alberta Pandas
- Winning coach: Doug Reimer (11th title)
- Championship MVP: Lucy Borowski (UBC)
- Television: CBC; Stephen Clark (play-by-play); Lauren Breadner (colour analyst); Matthew Davison (play-by-play); Theresa Skubic (colour analyst); Francis Maheu (French play-by-play)

The 2024 U Sports Women's Volleyball Championship was held from March 15 to March 17, 2024, in Hamilton, Ontario, to determine a national champion for the 2023–24 U Sports women's volleyball season. The second-seeded UBC Thunderbirds defeated the fourth-seeded Alberta Pandas 3–1 to win the program's 14th national championship, which extended their record for the most in U Sports women's volleyball. The Thunderbirds became the first team to repeat as champions since UBC won their sixth consecutive championship in 2013.

== Host ==
The tournament was played at McMaster University at the Burridge Gymnasium on the school's campus. This was the third time that McMaster had hosted the tournament with the most recent occurring in 2012.

== Scheduled teams ==
Seed	Team	Qualified	Record	Last	Total
1	Manitoba Bisons	Canada West Champion	20–4	2014	7
2	UBC Thunderbirds	Canada West Finalist	22–2	2023	13
3	Brock Badgers	OUA Champion	18–2	None	0
4	Alberta Pandas	Canada West Bronze	18–6	2007	7
5	Montréal Carabins	RSEQ Champion	17–4	None	0
6	Acadia Axewomen	AUS Champion	15–5	None	0
7	McMaster Marauders	OUA Finalist (Host)	15–5	None	0
8	Saint Mary's Huskies	AUS Finalist	14–6	None	0

== Championship bracket ==
First Round: March 15
1	Manitoba Bisons	3
8	Saint Mary's Huskies	1
4	Alberta Pandas	3
5	Montreal Carabins	0
2	UBC Thunderbirds	3
7	McMaster Marauders	1
3	Brock Badgers	2
6	Acadia Axewomen	3

Semi-Finals: March 16
1	Manitoba Bisons	2
4	Alberta Pandas	3
2	UBC Thunderbirds	3
6	Acadia Axewomen	0

Gold Medal Game: March 17
2	UBC Thunderbirds	3
4	Alberta Pandas	1
Bronze Medal Game: March 17
1	Manitoba Bisons	3
6	Acadia Axewomen	0

=== Bronze medal match ===
17 March 2024; 2:00 p.m. EDT	(1) Manitoba Bisons	3–0	(6) Acadia Axewomen	Burridge Gymnasium; Hamilton, Ontario; Attendance: 272
17 March 2024; 2:00 p.m. EDT	(25–18, 25–13, 25–17); Boxscore			Burridge Gymnasium; Hamilton, Ontario; Attendance: 272

=== Gold medal match ===
17 March 2024; 6:00 p.m. EDT	(2) UBC Thunderbirds	3–1	(4) Alberta Pandas	Burridge Gymnasium; Hamilton, Ontario; Attendance: 1,700
17 March 2024; 6:00 p.m. EDT	(25–16, 23–25, 25–19, 25–23); Boxscore			Burridge Gymnasium; Hamilton, Ontario; Attendance: 1,700

== Consolation bracket ==
Semi-Finals: March 16
5	Montreal Carabins	1
8	Saint Mary's Huskies	3
3	Brock Badgers	0
7	McMaster Marauders	3

Fifth Place Game: March 17
7	McMaster Marauders	3
8	Saint Mary's Huskies	1

== Awards ==
=== Championship awards ===
- Championship MVP – Lucy Borowski, UBC

=== Mikasa Players of the Game ===
- Emma Doyon, UBC
- Lauryn Tremblay, Alberta

=== All-Star Team ===
- Katreena Bentley, Manitoba
- Lucy Borowski, UBC
- Akash Grewal, UBC
- Laila Johnston, Alberta
- Alexia Lemay-Evans, Acadia
- Lauryn Tremblay, Alberta
- Erika Vermette, UBC
