= Thunderbird Sports Centre =

Indoor sports arena at the University of British Columbia

Doug Mitchell Thunderbird Sports Centre
- The Doug, UBC Thunderbird Arena
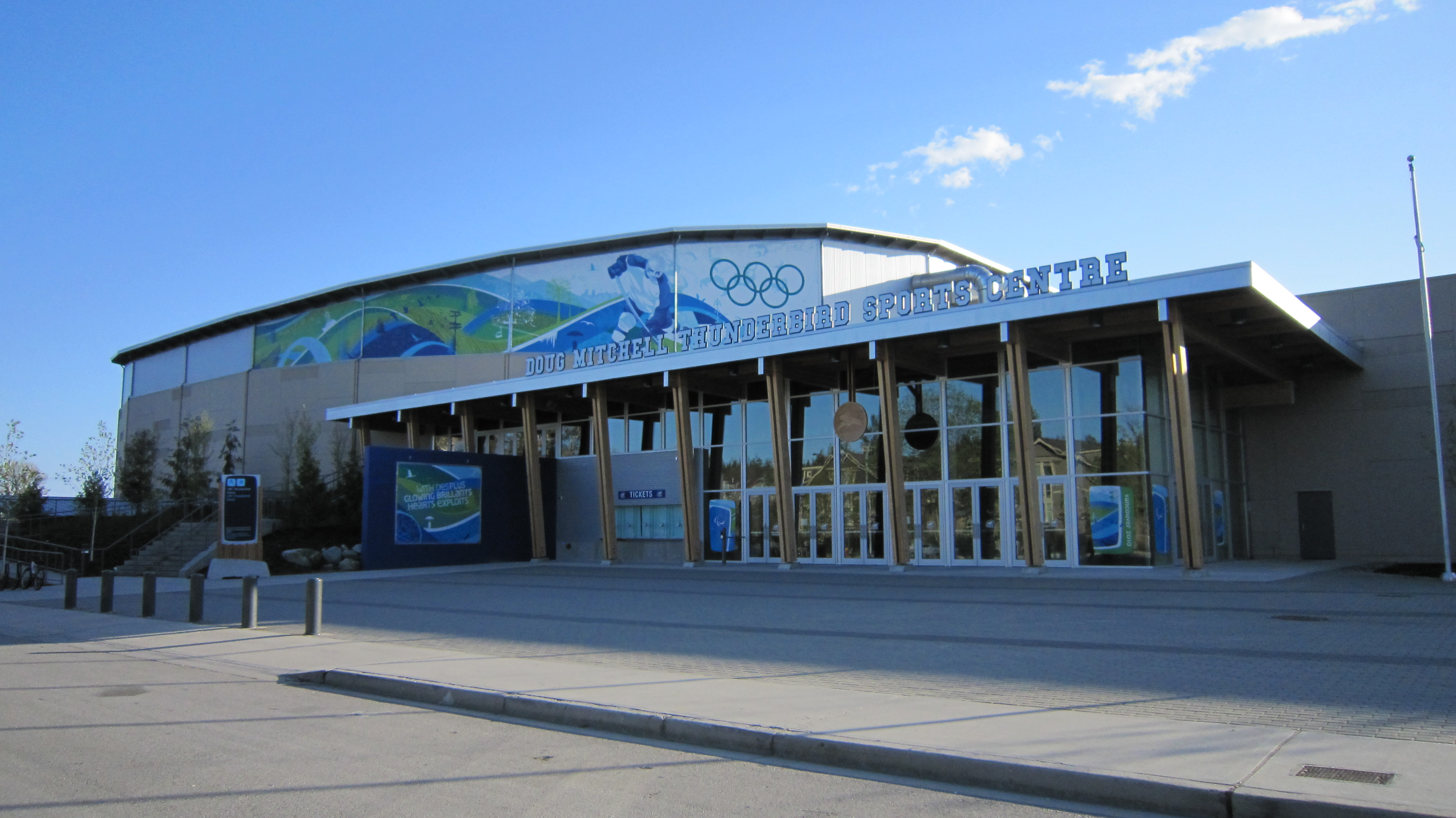
- Interactive map of Doug Mitchell; Thunderbird Sports Centre
- Former names: UBC Winter Sports Centre
- Location: UBC Vancouver, British Columbia, Canada
- Coordinates: 49°15′39.98″N 123°14′35.00″W
- Capacity: Ice hockey: 7,500; Concerts: 8,000

Construction
- Groundbreaking: April 2006
- Opened: 7 July 2008
- Cost: C$47.8 million
- Architect: Kasian Architecture

Tenants
- UBC Thunderbirds (U Sports) (2008–present); 2010 Winter Olympics; 2016 CIS Men's Basketball Championship; Vancouver Canucks (Practice Facility); 2025 U Sports Men's Basketball Championship; 2025 U Sports Women's Basketball Championship

The Doug Mitchell Thunderbird Sports Centre (formerly UBC Winter Sports Centre, also known as UBC Thunderbird Arena) is a LEED Silver certified indoor arena in Greater Vancouver, on the campus of the University of British Columbia. Located on the Point Grey campus lands, it is just outside the city limits of Vancouver, British Columbia. The arena is home to the UBC Thunderbirds men's and women's ice hockey teams, and contains one international-size 61 m × 30 m (200 ft × 98.4 ft) ice rink.

== Construction ==
The facility was built around an older ice hockey facility, the historic Father Bauer Arena, which opened in October 1963. This was named after the late Father David Bauer, who, together with Bob Hindmarch, established Canada's first national hockey team at UBC in 1963 in preparation for the 1964 Winter Olympics. The UBC Thunderbird Arena replaced the Father Bauer Arena as the home of the UBC Thunderbirds ice hockey team. It is also the practice facility for Vancouver's NHL team, the Vancouver Canucks.

The main ice rink has 7,500 seats and can expand to 8,000 for concerts. The other rinks are Father Bauer Arena and Protrans Arena with spectator capacities of 980 and 200, respectively.

Construction began in April 2006 with the refurbishment of the Father Bauer Arena and the addition of a new practice arena. The new stadium arena was opened on 7 July 2008. On 21 August 2009, the Thunderbird Sports Centre was renamed Doug Mitchell Thunderbird Sports Centre in honour of Doug Mitchell, an UBC alumnus, lawyer, and amateur and professional sports leader.

== 2010 Vancouver Olympics ==
The venue was used for several men's and women's ice hockey at the 2010 Winter Olympics, and was used for sledge hockey in the 2010 Winter Paralympics.

== Davis Cup ==
The venue was used in Canada's first round draw against France in the Davis Cup in February 2012, and it was used again in February and April 2013 when Canada faced Spain and then Italy.

== 2014 Special Olympics Canada Summer Games ==
The 2014 Special Olympics Canada Summer Games were held in Vancouver and the university was the host venue for the competition being held from 7 to 13 July 2014. The Games featured athletes with an intellectual disability from across the country competing in eleven sports, ten of which were also qualifiers for the 2015 Special Olympics World Summer Games in Los Angeles, California, United States.

== Notable events ==
- Fall Out Boy – Believers Never Die Tour Part Deux – 11 April 2009
- The Wiggles – Go Bananas! Live In Concert – 9 October 2009
- Sesame Street Live – Elmo's Healthy Heroes – 6–7 August 2011
- Sesame Street Live – Elmo Makes Music – 21–22 July 2012
- Bassnectar – Fall Tour 2012 – 27 October 2012
- The Wiggles – The Celebration Tour! – 28 October 2012
- Sesame Street Live – Elmo Makes Music – 21–22 December 2013
- Sesame Street Live – Let's Dance – 10–11 December 2014
- Sodagreen – Meet again World Tour – 20 September 2015
- A-Mei – Utopia World Tour – 29 November 2016
- Joker Xue – Skyscraper World Tour – 3 November 2018
- The 1975 – Music for Cars Tour – 26 April 2019
- JoJo Siwa – D.R.E.A.M. The Tour – 20 August 2019
- Olivia Rodrigo – Sour Tour – 7 April 2022
- Avril Lavigne – Love Sux Tour – 24 May 2022
- 5 Seconds of Summer – Take My Hand World Tour – 11 June 2022
- Carly Rae Jepsen – The So Nice Tour – 29 October 2022
- Jim Gaffigan – Dark Pale Tour – 15 January 2023
- Nav – Never Sleep '23 Tour – 12 March 2023
- Keshi – Hell & Back Tour – 1 April 2023
- Lewis Capaldi – Broken by Desire to Be Heavenly Sent Tour – 25 April 2023
- Jackson Wang – Magic Man World Tour – 30 April 2023
- Kali Uchis – Red Moon In Venus Tour – 23 May 2023
- A Boogie wit da Hoodie – Me Vs. Myself Tour – 10–11 June 2023
- Jimmy Carr – Terribly Funny Tour – 24 June 2023
- Louis Tomlinson – Faith in the Future World Tour – 26 June 2023
- Charlie Puth – Charlie the Live Experience – 3 July 2023
- Lil Yachty – Field Trip Tour – 21 October 2023
- Hatsune Miku – Miku Expo – 4 April 2024 & 18 April 2026
- The Kid Laroi – The First Time World Tour – 18 May 2024
- Wallows – Model World Tour – 7 August 2024
- Sam Fender - People Watching Tour - 5 April 2025
- Bini - Biniverse World Tour 2025 - 21 June 2025
- Raye - This Tour May Contain: New Music - 2 April 2026
- Madison Beer - The Locket Tour - 15 June 2026
