= 2013 CIS Women's Volleyball Championship =

- Season: 2012–13
- Teams: Eight
- Finals site: Univestrie Pavilion; Sherbrooke, Quebec
- Champions: UBC Thunderbirds (10th title)
- Runner-up: Alberta Pandas
- Winning coach: Doug Reimer (7th title)
- Championship MVP: Lisa Barclay (UBC Thunderbirds)

The 2013 CIS Women's Volleyball Championship was held February 28, 2013 to March 2, 2013, in Sherbrooke, Quebec, to determine a national champion for the 2012–13 CIS women's volleyball season. The tournament was played at the Univestrie Pavilion at the Université de Sherbrooke. It was the second time that Sherbrooke had hosted the tournament with the first time occurring in 1988.

The gold medal match featured a rematch of the previous year's final, which had not occurred since the 1995 and 1996 games between the Pandas and the Rouge et Or. In this match, the top-seeded UBC Thunderbirds won their sixth consecutive national championship in their 3–0 match victory over the Alberta Pandas. This tied the record for consecutive national championships with the Winnipeg Wesmen (1983-1988) and Alberta Pandas (1995-2000). The Thunderbirds finished the season on a 25-game winning streak and the gold medal win was the program's CIS-leading 10th national championship.

== Participating teams ==
Seed	Team	Qualified	Record	Last	Total
1	UBC Thunderbirds	Canada West Champion	21–1	2012	9
2	Montreal Carabins	RSEQ Champion	14–6	None	0
3	Ottawa Gee-Gees	OUA Champion	16–2	None	0
4	Trinity Western Spartans	Canada West Finalist	19–3	None	0
5	Dalhousie Tigers	AUS Champion	16–2	1982	1
6	Sherbrooke Vert et Or	RSEQ Finalist (Host)	15–5	2005	2
7	Alberta Pandas	Canada West Bronze	15–7	2007	7
8	Laval Rouge et Or	RSEQ Bronze	15–5	2006	1

== Championship bracket ==
First Round: February 28
1	UBC Thunderbirds	3
8	Laval Rouge et Or	0
4	Trinity Western Spartans	3
5	Dalhousie Tigers	0
2	Montreal Carabins	1
7	Alberta Pandas	3
3	Ottawa Gee-Gees	3
6	Sherbrooke Vert et Or	0

Semi-Finals: March 1
1	UBC Thunderbirds	3
4	Trinity Western Spartans	1
7	Alberta Pandas	3
3	Ottawa Gee-Gees	2

Gold Medal Game: March 2
1	UBC Thunderbirds	3
7	Alberta Pandas	0
Bronze Medal Game: March 2
3	Ottawa Gee-Gees	0
4	Trinity Western Spartans	3

== Consolation bracket ==
Semi-Finals: March 1
2	Montreal Carabins	1
6	Sherbrooke Vert et Or	3
5	Dalhousie Tigers	1
8	Laval Rouge et Or	3

Fifth Place Game: March 2
6	Sherbrooke Vert et Or	3
8	Laval Rouge et Or	0

== Awards ==
=== Championship awards ===
- CIS Tournament MVP – Lisa Barclay, UBC
- R.W. Pugh Fair Play Award – Krista Zubick, Alberta

=== All-Star Team ===
- Lisa Barclay, UBC
- Shanice Marcelle, UBC
- Brina Derksen-Bergen, UBC
- Jaki Ellis, Alberta
- Amy Ott, Trinity Western
- Kelci French, Trinity Western
- Karina Krueger Schwanke, Ottawa
