= Mary Lyons Award =

Canadian volleyball award

- Sport: Indoor volleyball
- League: U Sports
- First awarded: 1981 to Andrée Ledoux
- Most recent: Abby Guezen, Alberta Pandas
- Website: usports.ca

The Mary Lyons Award is awarded annually to the women's volleyball player of the year in U Sports (previously named Canadian Interuniversity Sport). The award is named after Mary Lyons who served as president of the Ontario-Quebec Women’s Conference Intercollegiate Association (OQWCIA) and the Ontario Women’s Intercollegiate Athletic Association (OWIAA), and as a director of the Canadian Women's Interuniversity Athletic Union (CWIAU) and the Canadian Interuniversity Athletic Union (CIAU). Lyons, a graduate of Queen's University and the State University of New York, also served as Co-ordinator of Women's Interuniversity Athletics at York University for 26 years and coached the York Yeowomen volleyball team for seven years.

Nine players have won the award multiple times, but no player has claimed the award more than twice. The Winnipeg Wesmen program has featured the most winners of the award, with nine, including the most consecutive winners with seven from 1983 to 1989. Following the cancellation of the 2020-21 season due to the COVID-19 pandemic, there was no award winner in 2021.

== List of winners ==
Season	Winner	Team
1980-81	Andrée Ledoux	Laval Rouge et Or
1981-82	Karin Massen	Dalhousie Tigers
1982-83	Jamie Hancharyk	Winnipeg Wesmen
1983-84	Jamie Hancharyk	Winnipeg Wesmen
1984-85	Ruth Klassen	Winnipeg Wesmen
1985-86	Ruth Burchuk	Winnipeg Wesmen
1986-87	Brenda Boroski	Winnipeg Wesmen
1987-88	Brenda Boroski	Winnipeg Wesmen
1988-89	Monica Lueg	Winnipeg Wesmen
1989-90	Lara Melville	Victoria Vikettes
1990-91	Michelle Sawatzky	Manitoba Bisons
1991-92	Michelle Sawatzky	Manitoba Bisons
1992-93	Diane Scott	Winnipeg Wesmen
1993-94	Sandy Newsham	Winnipeg Wesmen
1994-95	Lorriann Sawatzky	Manitoba Bisons
1995-96	Miroslava Pribylova	Alberta Pandas
1996-97	Miroslava Pribylova	Alberta Pandas
1997-98	Louise Wlock	Manitoba Bisons
1998-99	Jenny Cartmell	Alberta Pandas
1999-00	Jenny Cartmell	Alberta Pandas
2000-01	Alisa Marriott	Calgary Dinos
2001-02	Kathy Preston	Manitoba Bisons
2002-03	Marylène Laplante	Laval Rouge et Or
2003-04	Joanna Niemczewska	Calgary Dinos
2004-05	Joanna Niemczewska	Calgary Dinos
2005-06	Marylène Laplante	Laval Rouge et Or
2006-07	Tiffany Dodds	Alberta Pandas
2007-08	Laetitia Tchoualack	Montréal Carabins
2008-09	Laetitia Tchoualack	Montréal Carabins
2009-10	Liz Cordonier	UBC Thunderbirds
2010-11	Shanice Marcelle	UBC Thunderbirds
2011-12	Kyla Richey	UBC Thunderbirds
2012-13	Shanice Marcelle	UBC Thunderbirds
2013-14	Lisa Barclay	UBC Thunderbirds
2014-15	Rachel Cockrell	Manitoba Bisons
2015-16	Iuliia Pakhomenko	Thompson Rivers WolfPack
2016-17	Meg Casault	Alberta Pandas
2017-18	Marie-Alex Bélanger	Montréal Carabins
2018-19	Kiera Van Ryk	UBC Thunderbirds
2019-20	Courtney Baker	Dalhousie Tigers
2020-21	Not awarded due to the COVID-19 pandemic	
2021-22	Kory White	Alberta Pandas
2022-23	Gabrielle Attieh	UFV Cascades
2023-24	Raya Surinx	Manitoba Bisons
2024-25	Raya Surinx	Manitoba Bisons
2025-26	Abby Guezen	Alberta Pandas
