= Tricia Mayba =

Canadian volleyball player (born 1989)

Personal information
- Nationality: Canadian
- Born: 2 July 1989 (age 37) Winnipeg, Manitoba
- Education: University of Manitoba
- Height: 1.86 m (6 ft 1 in)
- Spike: 306 cm (120 in)
- Block: 290 cm (110 in)

Volleyball information
- Current club: PTPS Piła
- Number: 1

Tricia Mayba (born 2 July 1989) is a Canadian female volleyball player. She is a member of the Canada women's national volleyball team and played for PTPS Piła in 2014.

She played CIS volleyball for the University of Manitoba where she won a silver medal at the 2010 CIS Women's Volleyball Championship. She was part of the Canadian national team at the 2010 FIVB Volleyball Women's World Championship.

== Clubs ==
- PTPS Piła
