= Shanice Marcelle =

Canadian women's volleyball player and coach (born 1990)

Personal information
- Nationality: Canadian
- Born: May 28, 1990 (age 36); Toronto, Ontario
- Hometown: Victoria, British Columbia
- Height: 1.80 m (5 ft 11 in)
- Education: UBC Thunderbirds

Coaching information
- Current team: Queen's Gaels
Previous teams coached
| Years | Teams |
|---|---|
| 2018–2024; 2024–present | York Lions; Queen's Gaels |

Beach volleyball information

Current teammate
| Years | Teammate |
|---|---|
| 2018–2021 | Julie Gordon |

Previous teammates
| Years | Teammate |
|---|---|
| 2017 | Jamie Broder |

Indoor volleyball information
- Position: Outside hitter

Career
| Years | Teams |
|---|---|
| 2013–2015; 2015–2016 | Dresdner SC; Nantes VB |

National team
| 2011–2023 | Canada |

Shanice Marcelle (born May 28, 1990) is a Canadian female volleyball player and head coach for the Queen's Gaels women's volleyball team. She is a five-time CIS volleyball champion as a university athlete and two-time Bundesliga champion as a professional athlete. Individually, she was twice awarded the CIS women's volleyball player of the year in 2011 and 2013, was the 2011 CIS volleyball championship MVP, and was named the 2013 winner of the BLG Award as the best female athlete in all of Canadian Interuniversity Sport. She joined the Canadian women's national volleyball team in 2011 and is a member of the beach volleyball national team.

== University career ==
Marcelle elected to play for the University of British Columbia Thunderbirds following her high school playing career rather than join an NCAA program in the United States, despite receiving offers to play there. While playing CIS volleyball, she would be able to participate in international competition over her five-year career while she would only be able to play for four years in the NCAA with no international options if she went south. Additionally, she had wanted to strengthen the sport in her home country and develop her skills in Canada.

Her first season in 2008–09 with UBC was a successful one as she was named Thunderbird Rookie Athlete of the Year and the Thunderbirds won the 2009 CIS Women's Volleyball Championship. For the 2009–10 season, the Thunderbirds repeated as national champions, which was their third in a row and Marcelle's second, as she was also the team's leading point-scorer in the championship win over the Manitoba Bisons.

After assuming more of a leadership role for the 2010–11 season, Marcelle had an outstanding season as she was in the top eight nationally in kills, service aces, and hitting percentage, while also leading the team in digs. Based on her multifaceted excellence that year, she was awarded the 2011 Mary Lyons Award as the best women's volleyball player that year. She was also named a First-Team All-Canadian in 2011. To cap off the strong season, the Thunderbirds once again won the national championship and Marcelle was named the tournament Most Valuable Player.

For the 2011–12 season, Marcelle was again named a First-Team All-Canadian and the Thunderbirds won the CIS women's volleyball championship. In her fifth and final CIS season in 2012–13, she became the first UBC player and ninth player overall to win two Mary Lyons Awards as her outstanding season also led to a third consecutive First-Team All-Canadian award. She was also named the BLG Award winner in 2013 as the top female athlete in Canadian Interuniversity Sport, becoming the fourth UBC player to win the award. To finish her university career, the Thunderbirds finished with a 21–1 regular season record en route to winning their sixth consecutive national championship. Individually, it meant that Marcelle was a national champion in each of her five seasons and was a tournament all-star in all five years.

== Professional and international career ==
Following her university career, Marcelle moved to Dresden, Germany where she played two seasons for Dresdner SC of Deutsche Volleyball-Bundesliga from 2013 to 2015. In both seasons that she played, Dresdner won the Bundesliga championship. In the summer of 2015, she played for Team Canada's indoor volleyball team at the 2015 Pan American Games. She then played one season for Nantes VB in Nantes, France from 2015 to 2016.

Due to a nagging shoulder injury, Marcelle was unable to participate in the Olympic trials for the 2016 Summer Olympics while she was a member of the Canada women's national volleyball team. During this time, she decided to switch from indoor volleyball to beach volleyball due to more of a reliance on skill in the beach game rather than the power required in the indoor game. She then had shoulder surgery in July 2016 and moved to Toronto in January 2017. She planned to compete with her beach volleyball partner, Jamie Broder, but Marcelle suffered a torn ACL injury within two months of her move to Toronto during a practice session. Following her rehabilitation, she played for Canada's beach volleyball national team alongside new partner, Julie Gordon, where they won gold medals at the 2019 Beach Nationals. She officially retired from the national team in December 2023.

== Coaching career ==
While recovering from her ACL injury, Marcelle began her coaching career by attending coaching camps and becoming a coach for The York School and Leaside Volleyball Club. She joined as an assistant coach for Team Ontario of the Ontario Volleyball Association in late 2017 and later became the team's head coach in 2018.

In August 2018, Marcelle was named an assistant coach for the York Lions women's volleyball team. She served in that capacity for six years and was named interim head coach in March 2024 during head coach Jen Neilson's leave.

On August 14, 2024, it was announced that Marcelle had accepted the position of head coach of the Queen's Gaels women's volleyball team, becoming the 15th head coach in the program's history.

== Personal life ==
Marcelle was born in Toronto, Ontario to parents Roger and Tracy Marcelle. She has an older sister, Tanisha, and a younger brother, Jordan. She moved to Errington, British Columbia when she was five years old with her mother following her parents' separation. Her family later moved to Victoria, British Columbia where she spent most of her childhood. She graduated from the University of British Columbia with a degree in Kinesiology.
