= Marie-Alex Bélanger =

Canadian women's volleyball player (born 1993)

Personal information
- Nationality: Canada
- Born: 13 April 1993 (age 33); Saint-Alphonse-Rodriguez, Quebec
- Height: 1.87 m (6 ft 2 in)
- Spike: 315 cm (124 in)
- Block: 295 cm (116 in)
- Education: Montreal Carabins

Volleyball information
- Position: Opposite spiker
- Current club: (Switzerland) Sm'Aesch Pfeffingen
- Number: 19

National team
2017–present	Canada
- Last updated: September 20, 2023

Marie-Alex Bélanger (born 13 April 1993) is a Canadian female volleyball player. She was part of the Canada women's national volleyball team, and participated at the 2017 FIVB Volleyball World Grand Prix, and 2018 FIVB Volleyball Women's World Championship.

== University career ==
Bélanger played U Sports volleyball for the University of Montreal Carabins for five seasons from 2013 to 2018. At the U Sports National Championship, she was a member of the bronze medal Carabins team in 2015. In 2018, she won both the Mary Lyons Award for U Sports Women's Volleyball Player of the Year and also the BLG Award for the U Sports Female Athlete of the Year.
