= UBC War Memorial Gymnasium =

Gymnasium at the University of British Columbia

Coordinates: 49°16′0″N 123°14′52″W

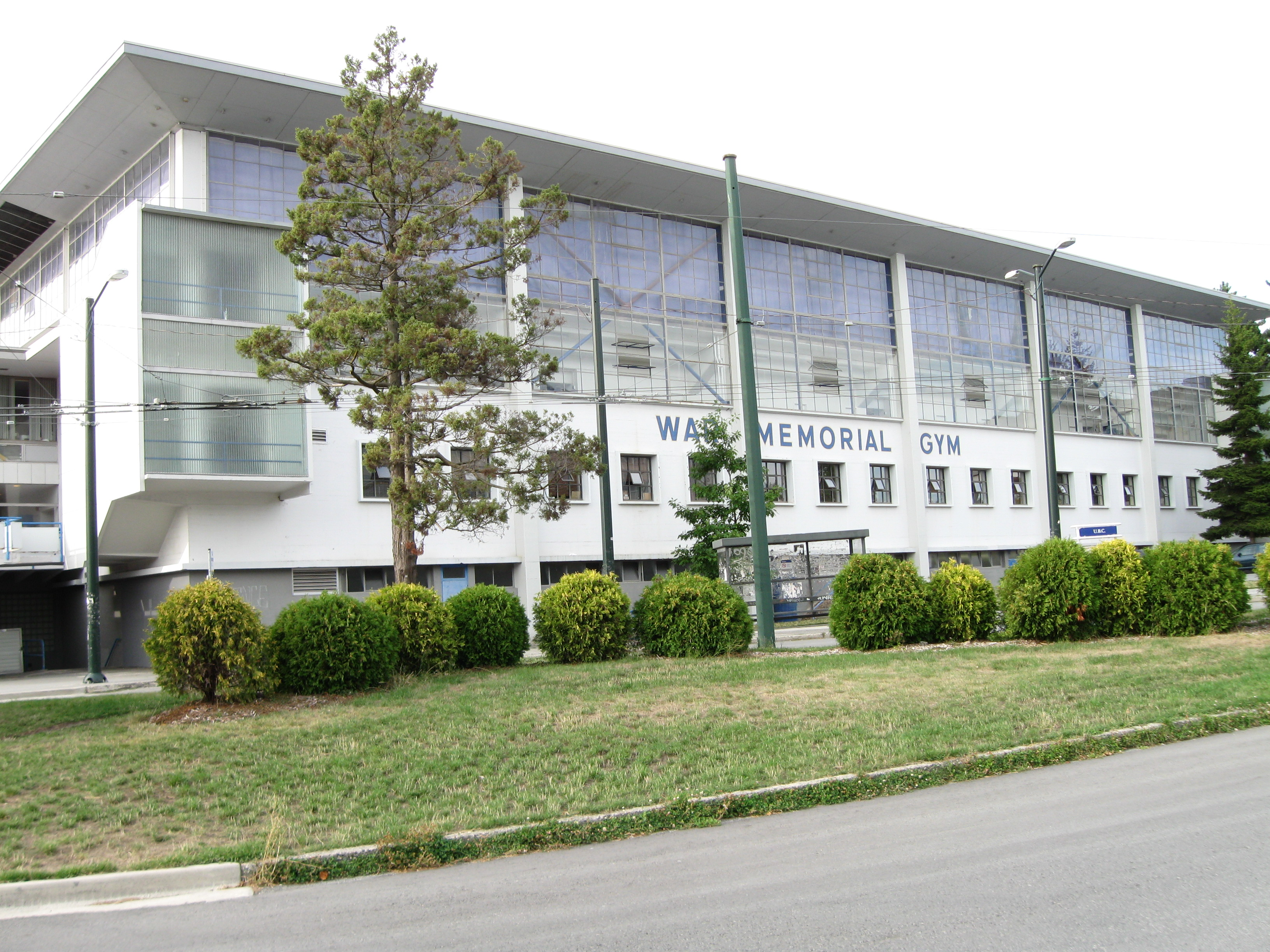
The War Memorial Gymnasium

War Memorial Gymnasium is a gymnasium on the University of British Columbia campus. It was officially dedicated on October 26, 1951, to the family members of service personnel who died in the two world wars. The Memorial walls have since been updated to reflect UBC's involvement with Canada's military. It is frequently referred to as 'The' 'Historic' War Memorial Gymnasium and hosts the annual UBC Remembrance Day Ceremony.

It is home to the UBC Thunderbirds basketball and volleyball teams, as well as the central offices for the Athletics and Human Kinetics departments. There are 2,222 permanent seats, with retractable bleachers that increase total capacity of 4,836. The gymnasium has hosted the likes of the Harlem Globetrotters, the B.C. high school basketball championships, concerts by Frank Zappa, Peter Tosh and Billy Idol, as well as others, and is the current venue for the finals of all division of the TELUS Basketball Classic. In October 2010, the Toronto Raptors held their first training in the province of BC in the venue.

Playing sports in this facility was unique because of the floor's special spring. Folklore has it that horsehair had been inserted beneath the wood surface, which has been since removed. It is still viewed as one of the premier University level basketball/volleyball facilities in Canada.
