= Linda Bock =

German volleyball player (born 2000)

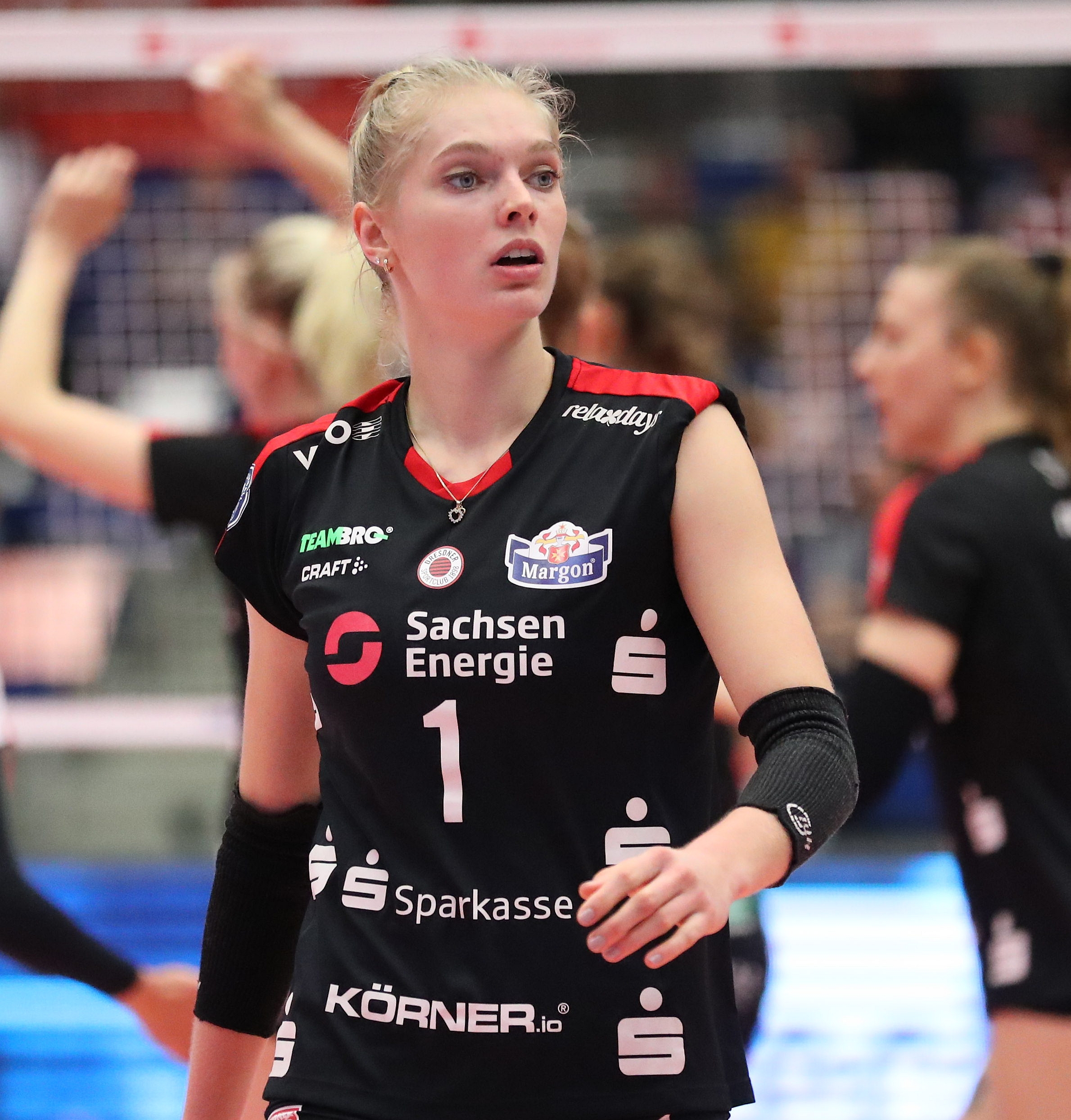

Linda Bock (born 27 May 2000 Borken) is a German volleyball player.

== Career ==
Bock was also a member of the German junior national team, achieving sixth place at the 2017 U18 European Championships held in the Netherlands and at the U18 World Championships in Argentina. In 2018, she repeated her sixth-place finish at the U19 European Championships in Albania.

At the 2019 Montreux Volley Masters, Bock had her debut in the senior national team. She competed at the 2019 FIVB Volleyball Women's Nations League, 2021 FIVB Volleyball Women's Nations League, and 2022 FIVB Volleyball Women's Nations League,

Bock played youth volleyball at RC Borken-Hoxfeld. In 2016, Bock became German U17 Beach Volleyball Champion in Magdeburg with Greta Klein-Hitpass. In 2018, she moved to USC Münster. She also played for the VC Olympia Berlin. For the 2021/22 season, she switched to the German champions Dresdner SC. In 2023 she switched to SSC Palmberg Schwerin.
