= Kyla Richey =

Canadian volleyball player (born 1989)

Personal information
- Nationality: Canadian
- Born: 20 June 1989 (age 37); Roberts Creek, British Columbia
- Hometown: Roberts Creek, British Columbia
- Height: 1.88 m (6 ft 2 in)
- Weight: 80 kg (180 lb)
- Spike: 309 cm (122 in)
- Block: 292 cm (115 in)
- Education: UBC Thunderbirds

Volleyball information
- Position: Outside hitter

Career
Years	Teams
2012–2013	(Germany) SC Potsdam
2013–2014	(Turkey) Yeşilyurt Istanbul
2014	(Italy) Tiboni Urbino
2014–2015	(Germany) Rote Raben Vilsbiburg
2015–2016	(Azerbaijan) Azeryol Baku
2016–2017	(Greece) Panathinaikos
2017–2018	(Indonesia) Jakarta Pertamina Energi
2018–2019	(Peru) Universidad San Martín
2019–2020	(Puerto Rico) Indias de Mayagüez
2020–2021	(France) Stade Français Paris Saint-Cloud

National team
2009–2021	Canada
Honours
Women's volleyball
Representing Canada
Challenger Cup
Gold medal – first place	2019 Lima	Team
- Last updated: January 2026

Kyla Richey (born 20 June 1989) is a Canadian former volleyball player. An outside hitter, she represented the Canada women's national volleyball team from 2009 to 2021, earning 143 international caps and serving as team captain from 2018 until her retirement. She is the only Canadian woman to have competed in three FIVB World Championships (2010, 2014, 2018).

At university level, Richey won five consecutive national championships with the UBC Thunderbirds and was named U Sports Championship MVP in 2009 and U Sports Women's Volleyball Player of the Year in 2011–12. She played professionally in Germany, Turkey, Italy, Azerbaijan, Greece, Indonesia, Peru, Puerto Rico, and France, and was named the top scorer of the Peruvian volleyball league in 2019.

== Early life ==
Richey grew up in Roberts Creek, British Columbia, on the Sunshine Coast. Her father George was a wrestler who competed at the 1974 World Championships and was a CIS champion, while her mother Jan played volleyball at UBC. Richey started playing volleyball at age 10 and first represented Canada when she was in Grade 10.

== University career ==
Richey played U Sports volleyball for the University of British Columbia Thunderbirds for five seasons from 2007 to 2012. She won the U Sports National Championship in each of her five seasons with UBC, becoming a five-time national champion.

She was named the Championship MVP for the 2009 championship. In her final year (2011–12), she won the Mary Lyons Award as U Sports Women's Volleyball Player of the Year and was co-recipient of the May Brown Trophy as UBC's outstanding graduating female athlete. She graduated with a Bachelor of Kinesiology in 2012.

== Club career ==
After graduating from UBC, Richey began her professional career with SC Potsdam in the German Bundesliga (2012–13). She then played for Yeşilyurt Istanbul in Turkey (2013–14) and Tiboni Urbino in Italy's Serie A1 in 2014.

She played the 2014–15 season with Rote Raben Vilsbiburg in Germany before joining Azeryol Baku in Azerbaijan (2015–16) and Panathinaikos in Greece (2016–17). In 2017–18, Richey competed in Indonesia's Proliga with Jakarta Pertamina Energi.

Richey played the 2018–19 season in Peru with Universidad San Martín, where she was named the league's top scorer. She spent 2019–20 with Indias de Mayagüez in Puerto Rico and concluded her professional career with Stade Français Paris Saint-Cloud in France's Ligue A Féminine in 2020–21.

== National team career ==
Richey joined Canada's national program in 2005, making the Junior National team while still in high school. She competed at the 2007 NORCECA Continental Women's Junior (U20) Championship before progressing to the senior squad in 2009.

She represented Canada for twelve years on the senior team, appearing in 143 international matches. Richey is the only Canadian woman to compete in three FIVB Volleyball World Championships: the 2010 World Championships in Japan, the 2014 FIVB Volleyball Women's World Championship in Italy, and the 2018 FIVB Volleyball Women's World Championship in Japan.

Richey was named captain of the national team in 2018. Under her captaincy, Canada won the 2019 FIVB Volleyball Women's Challenger Cup in Lima, Peru, defeating the Czech Republic in the final to qualify for the Volleyball Nations League for the first time. She served as captain until her retirement in 2021.

== Personal life ==
Richey had a brother, Connor, who suddenly passed away in 2013. She married former national team player Rudy Verhoeff. After retiring from volleyball, Richey and her husband founded Valley Commons Winery in Oliver, British Columbia.
