= Doug Reimer =

Canadian volleyball coach

Current position
- Title: Head coach
- Team: UBC Thunderbirds
- Conference: Canada West
- Record: 359–97 (.787)

Biographical details
- Born: 1961 (age 64–65); Kelowna, British Columbia
- Education: University of Victoria

Coaching career (HC unless noted)
- 1985–1987: Victoria Vikettes (HC)
- 1992–1994: Winnipeg Wesmen (HC)
- 1994–1997: UBC Thunderbirds (HC)
- 1996–2000: Team Canada (HC)
- 2000–present: UBC Thunderbirds (HC)

Accomplishments and honors

Championships
- 11x National Champion (1993, 2008–2013, 2017, 2019, 2023, 2024) 8x Canada West Champion (1986, 1987, 2006, 2009–2011, 2013, 2014) Canada Games Gold Medal winner (1989)

Awards
- 5x U Sports Coach of the Year (1986, 1993, 1994, 2006, 2010)

Doug Reimer (born 1961) is the head coach for the UBC Thunderbirds' women's volleyball team and is a former volleyball player. As a head coach, he has won the U Sports women's volleyball championship 11 times (once with the Winnipeg Wesmen and ten with the Thunderbirds) and has been named the U Sports women's volleyball coach of the year five times.

== Playing career ==
Reimer played CIAU men's volleyball for the Victoria Vikes where he was named an All-Canadian setter twice and won the school's top student-athlete award.

== Coaching career ==
Reimer began his coaching career as the head coach for the Vikettes for the 1985–86 season where he led the team to a 15–0 regular season record, a Canada West title, and was named the CIAU coach of the year. In the 1986–87 season, the Vikettes again won the Canada West title and finished in fourth place in the 1987 Women's Volleyball Championship tournament. He then went on to coach Saskatchewan's women's team in the 1989 Canada Games to a gold medal win. After his time in Saskatchewan, Reimer joined the Winnipeg Wesmen volleyball team as the head coach where he led them to a gold medal finish in the CIAU Women's Volleyball Championship tournament and his first national championship in 1993. He was also named coach of the year in 1993 and 1994.

Reimer joined the UBC Thunderbirds program for the 1994–1995 season where he had an immediate impact as he led the team to their first national tournament appearance since 1991, but lost in the opening match to his former team, the Winnipeg Wesmen. The Thunderbirds won the Bronze medal over the Wesmen in 1996 and then won the silver medal in 1997 after losing to the Alberta Pandas in the championship match. He left UBC after that season to become the full-time head coach of Canada women's national volleyball team, but returned to UBC for the 2000–01 season. Upon Reimer's return, the Thunderbirds regularly appeared in national championship tournaments, appearing every year in his first six years back where he won two silver medals and two bronze medals in that time span, including his fourth coach of the year win in 2006.

After an absence from nationals in 2007, Reimer and the Thunderbirds ended a 30-year drought by winning their first national championship since 1978 by winning the gold medal over the Montreal Carabins at the 2008 tournament. The Thunderbirds won the Canada West title and the national title again in 2009, becoming the first repeat champions since the 2001–02 Manitoba Bisons. For the 2009–10 season, the Thunderbirds finished with a perfect 27–0 record against CIS opponents en route to their third consecutive national championship. Reimer was named the coach of the year for the fifth time in his career, which is a U Sports record. The Thunderbirds continued their dominance as Reimer led the team to three more titles as the six consecutive championships tied the U Sports volleyball record for the most title wins in a row. The Thunderbirds lost the gold medal match in the 2014 CIS Women's Volleyball Championship, which ended their streak at six. This period was also notable as Reimer had one of his players win the league's player of the year award for five straight seasons from 2010 to 2014.

After finishing without a national medal in 2015 and 2016, Reimer once again led the Thunderbirds to a gold medal victory in the 2017 U Sports Women's Volleyball Championship which was his fourth championship win over the Alberta Pandas (Three with UBC and one with Winnipeg) and his eighth overall. He won a bronze medal in 2018 and then made history as the 2018–19 Thunderbirds became the first eighth-seeded team to win a national championship with their 2019 gold medal win. Reimer won his ninth national championship with this win. However, in the 2019–20 season, the Thunderbirds slumped to a 13–11 record where they lost to the Mount Royal Cougars in the Canada West Quarterfinals and failed to qualify for the national tournament for the first time since 2007. Reimer did not coach in 2020–21 due to the COVID-19 pandemic in Canada. In the 2022–23 season, the Thunderbirds lost in the conference quarter-finals, but qualified for the 2023 national tournament since they were the host team. Reimer led his team to another national championship as he won his tenth as a head coach. In 2023–24, the Thunderbirds finished first in the Canada West regular season with a 22–2 record, but lost the conference title game to the Manitoba Bisons. In the 2024 championship tournament, Reimer and the Thunderbirds repeated as champions for the first time since 2013.
