= Lisa Barclay =

Canadian volleyball player

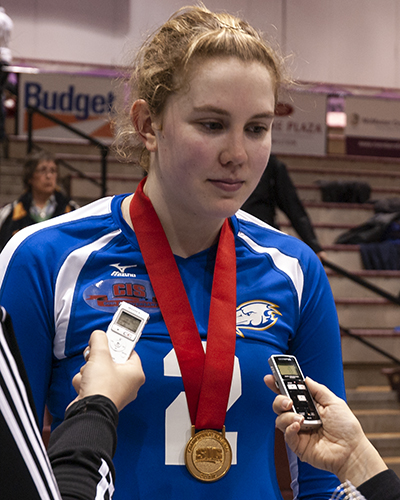
- Lisa Barclay being interviewed after leading the UBC Thunderbirds to the 2012 CIS (now U SPORTS) Women's Volleyball Championship title in Hamilton, Ontario.

Personal information
- Nationality: Canada
- Born: 7 June 1992 (age 34)
- Height: 1.88 m (6 ft 2 in)
- Spike: 316 cm (124 in)
- Block: 297 cm (117 in)

Volleyball information
- Number: 2

Career
Years	Teams
2014	(Canada) University of British Columbia

Lisa Barclay (born 7 June 1992) is a Canadian volleyball player. She is a member of the Canada women's national volleyball team and played for University of British Columbia in 2014. She was part of the Canadian national team at the 2014 FIVB Volleyball Women's World Championship in Italy.

== Clubs ==
- (Canada) University of British Columbia (2014)
