= UBC Thunderbirds =

University of British Columbia Vancouver athletic teams

- University: University of British Columbia (Vancouver)
- Nickname: Thunderbirds
- Association: U Sports, NAIA
- Conference: Canada West, CCC, MPSF
- Athletic director: Kavie Toor
- Location: Point Grey campus lands, British Columbia (Note: The Vancouver campus of UBC is located on an unincorporated area just outside the city limits of Vancouver.)
- Varsity teams: 26 (13 men's, 13 women's)
- Football stadium: Thunderbird Stadium
- Basketball arena: War Memorial Gym
- Ice hockey arena: Doug Mitchell Centre
- Baseball stadium: Tourmaline West Stadium
- Soccer stadium: Thunderbird Stadium
- Aquatics center: UBC Aquatic Centre
- Rowing venue: John M.S. Lecky Boathouse
- Volleyball arena: War Memorial Gym
- Rugby venue: Gerald McGavin Centre
- Colors: Blue and gold
- Mascot: Thunder
- Fight song: "Hail, UBC!"
- Website: gothunderbirds.ca

The UBC Thunderbirds are the athletic teams that represent the Vancouver campus of the University of British Columbia (UBC). In Canadian intercollegiate competition, the Thunderbirds are the most successful athletic program both regionally in the Canada West conference, and nationally in U Sports, winning 123 national titles. UBC has won an additional 24 national titles competing in the National Association of Intercollegiate Athletics against collegiate competition from the United States and 47 national titles in sports that compete in independent competitions.

== Teams ==
Across 15 varsity sport disciplines, UBC fields 26 teams overall; notably, 15 of which compete in U Sports, six in the American collegiate NAIA, and five of which are independent of these governing organizations:

Men's sports	Women's sports
Baseball	Basketball
Basketball	Cross country
Cross country	Field hockey
Field hockey	Golf
Football	Ice hockey
Golf	Rowing
Ice hockey	Rugby
Rowing	Rugby 7s
Rugby	Soccer
Soccer	Softball
Swimming	Swimming
Track and field	Track and field
Volleyball	Volleyball

Associations

(m/w) teams in all cases except where indicates:

- U Sports: Basketball, cross country, football (m), ice hockey, swimming, volleyball
- NAIA: baseball (m), golf, softball (w), track and field
- independent: field hockey, rowing, rugby (m), rugby 7s (w)
  - Men's rowing competes in the Mountain Pacific Sports Federation, an NCAA conference. Neither U Sports, the NCAA, nor the NAIA organizes a men's rowing championship.

=== Baseball ===
In the summer of 1996, 30 years after the original UBC baseball program was disbanded due to budget cuts, Athletic Director Bob Phillip was encouraged and excited for former professional baseball player Jim Murphy to bring baseball back to UBC. Community baseball coach Mark Hiscott provided funding and the team was born. Hiscott recognized student Terry McKaig, a former collegiate player and national team member, as the one to take over the program from Jim Murphy as head coach. Since 1997, McKaig has been the driving force behind the T-Birds with support and funding from such major leaguers as Jeff Zimmerman and Ryan Dempster. In 2015, Chris Pritchett was named the new head coach of the baseball team and Terry moved up to the position of Director of Baseball. After Murphy started the program, baseball eventually became a varsity sport across Canada.

The Thunderbirds compete in the United States as the only Canadian member of the National Association of Intercollegiate Athletics (NAIA). In 2001, the program reached a new level as the New York Mets made Derran Watts the first ever Thunderbird to be drafted, when they selected him in the 12th round. Since then nine more Thunderbirds have been drafted including 2007 World Series starter Jeff Francis. T-bird baseball successes include their trip to the 2006 and 2025 NAIA World Series.

=== Football ===
The UBC Thunderbirds football team has won the CWUAA Hardy Trophy conference championship 16 times, which is third all-time among competing teams. On a national level, the team has won the Vanier Cup championship four times, in 1982, 1986, 1997 and, most recently, in 2015. The team has also lost three times in the title game, in 1978, 1987, and 2023. The Thunderbirds program has also yielded three Hec Crighton Trophy winners: Jordan Gagner in 1987; Mark Nohra in 1997; and, most recently, Billy Greene in 2011.

=== Men's ice hockey ===
Father David Bauer coached the Thunderbirds for two seasons, and led the team to a Western Canadian Intercollegiate Athletic Association championship in 1963, and reached the final game of the Canadian Interuniversity Athletic Union men's ice hockey championship tournament for the CIAU University Cup, but lost by a 3–2 score to the McMaster Marauders.

Bob Hindmarch began coaching the men's ice hockey team during the 1964–65 season, and led them to the 1971 Western Canadian Intercollegiate Athletic Association championship. He accumulated a winning record in 11 of 12 seasons, and set UBC record with 214 wins by a coach in ice hockey. In December 1973, they became one of the first Western Bloc sports teams to tour China, and played a series of games focused on friendship and teaching hockey skills to local players. The trip was supported by the Government of Canada as part of a desire to normalize relations with China, and was not well-publicized at the time. The Thunderbirds won all seven games played by a combined scored of 56 to 5.

=== Men's rugby ===
Men's rugby is one of the oldest varsity sports at UBC (including the precursor to UBC, McGill University College of BC, varsity rugby started in 1906). The varsity XV now competes against the University of Victoria in a two-game, combined score series to claim the coveted "Boot". They also play a two-game, combined score series against the University of California for the "World Cup" trophy (a competition started in 1921). The varsity XV was coached for many years by Spence McTavish (former UBC varsity rugby captain, former Canadian rugby international and captain, and former Bobby Gaul award winner), and assistant coach Rod Holloway (former UBC varsity rugby scrumhalf, and former assistant coach of Canada's National Senior Men's team (RWC 1995).

The men's team is currently coached by Didier Banse.

UBC's rugby program has a long tradition of producing national team rugby players (7s and 15s), most recently Jim Douglas (RWC 2003), Mike Burak (RWC 2007), Chris Pack, Ryan MacWhinney, Justin Mensah-Coker, Tyler Hotson, Eric Wilson, Harry Jones (RWC 2015), Brock Staller and Ben LeSage.

U Sports does not currently contest a national championship for Men's Rugby, however UBC are five-time champions of the independent Canadian University Men's Rugby Championship in 2017, 2018, 2021, 2022, and 2023, the trophy of which is named after Spence McTavish. They also compete in the BC Rugby Premier League, alongside fellow CUMRC member UVic. The Thunderbirds are one of only two teams to have won the BC Premier League in the last ten years, the other being the UBC Old Boys Ravens, a team formed from former UBC students.

=== Women's rugby ===
Women's rugby is 5 time CanWest XVs Champions and 2024 7s & 15s National Champions. Alongside U Sport's 15s competition, the Thunderbirds compete in the Women's Premier League of the BC Rugby Union, as well as fielding reserve teams in the lower divisions. The Thunderbirds made their 3rd straight appearance in the national championship in 2026, facing UVic, who also had featured in the previous two years. UBC was aiming for a 3peat, but fell to Victoria 17-0.

=== Men's soccer ===
The UBC Thunderbirds are the most successful men's soccer program in Canada, having won 14 U Sports championships, nine more than any other school in the country. They have also won 22 Canada West conference titles since competition started in 1972.

Notable players include Brian Budd, Pat Onstad, and Srdjan Djekanovic.

In the 1960s and 1970s, the Thunderbirds played in the old Pacific Coast League, notably finishing as league runners up in 1967–68 and 1968–69.

=== Men's volleyball ===
The Thunderbirds men's volleyball team has won four U Sports men's volleyball championships and five conference championships. Kerry MacDonald took over the helm of the men's volleyball program starting with the 2016–17 season. In the following season, the Thunderbirds defeated the two-time defending champion Trinity Western Spartans in straight sets in the U Sports gold medal match on March 18, 2018 to win their first national title since 1983. MacDonald resigned after this season to take a position with Volley Canada and Mike Hawkins took over as head coach for the 2018–19 season.

=== Women's volleyball ===
The Thunderbirds women's volleyball team has been the most successful program in its sport, with 14 National Championship victories, most recently in 2024. The Thunderbirds have also won 16 conference titles with the most recent win occurring in 2014. The team has been led by head coach Doug Reimer since 2000 (and from 1994 to 1997) and he has accounted for ten of the program's championship wins. Notably, in the 2013 gold medal match, the Thunderbirds defeated the Alberta Pandas in straight sets to tie U Sports' all-time record—shared with the Winnipeg Wesmen (1983–1988) and Alberta Pandas (1995–2000) for holding the longest reign as a repeat champion in the sport with six consecutive wins (2008–2013). The program has also featured five Mary Lyons Award winners, with Liz Cordonier (2010), Shanice Marcelle (2011, 2013), Kyla Richey (2012), Lisa Barclay (2014), and Kiera Van Ryk (2019) each winning the award.

=== Women's field hockey ===
The UBC women's field hockey team has won the most titles out of any school in Canada, with 20 since 1978. This includes 7 straight from 2011-2017. The Thunderbirds also hold records for total wins (105), consecutive wins (13), and consecutive finals appearances (9). They have a fierce rivalry with Victoria, who are also one of the best programs in the country. After a 8 year drought, the Thunderbirds defeated Victoria and claimed the 2026 CanWest championship and a spot in the national tournament. They tied against Toronto in the first game, but wins against Waterloo and PEI booked their rematch against the Varsity Blues in the final, which they won 2-1.

Along with competing in the USports championship, the program also fields teams in the Vancouver Women's Field Hockey Association. Two Point Grey Thunderbirds teams participate, one in the Premier Division, and one in the second tier Division One. The Premier Division squad won the 2024 WVFHA title, defeating West Vancouver 2-1. The two met again in the following years final, West Vancouver winning 5-2.

== Club Teams ==
=== Men's Field Lacrosse ===
The Thunderbirds field a team in the Canada West Field Lacrosse League. The team has competed in the CWFLL since 2014, but has yet to win a title.

== Facilities ==
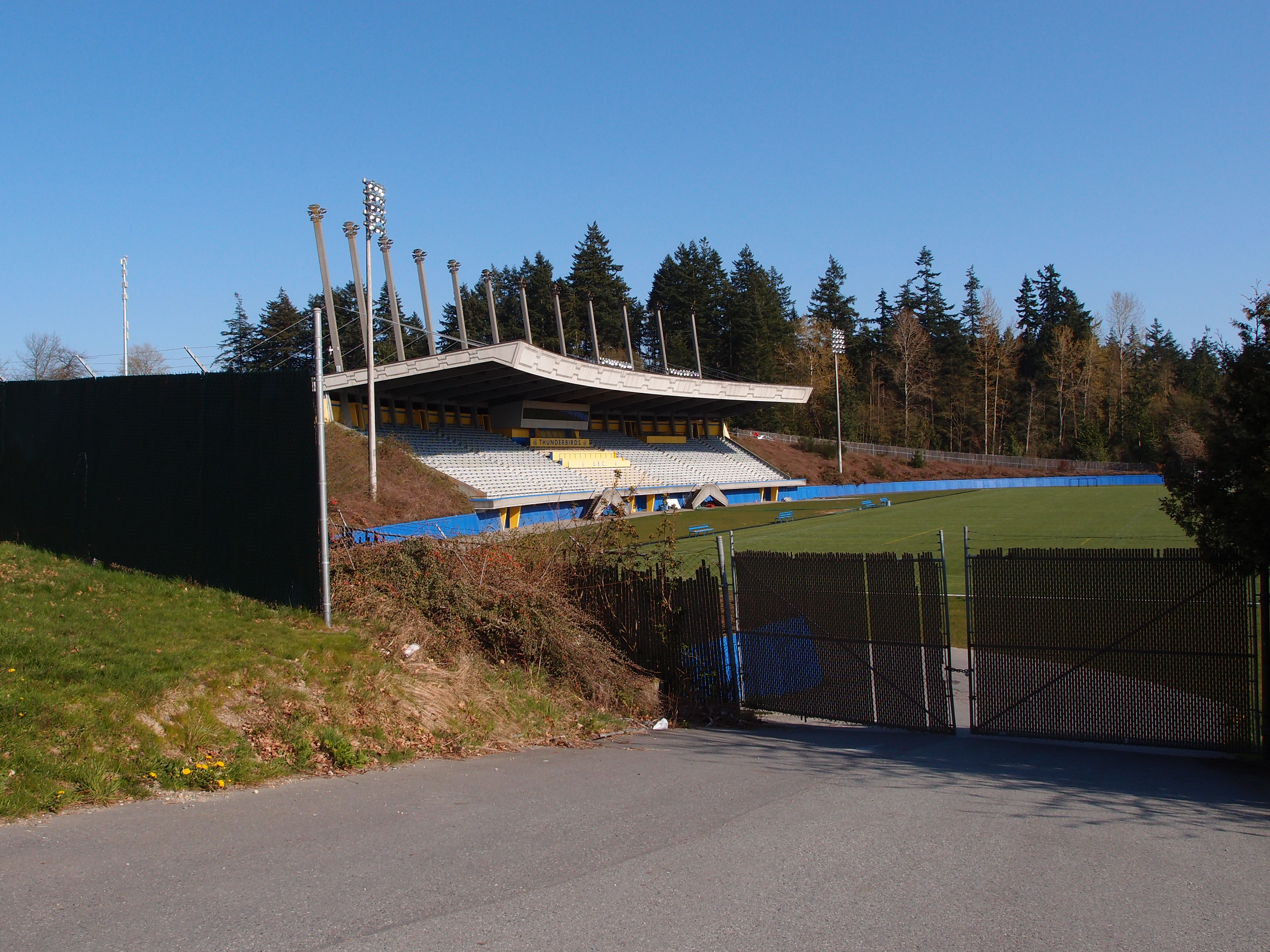
Thunderbird Stadium

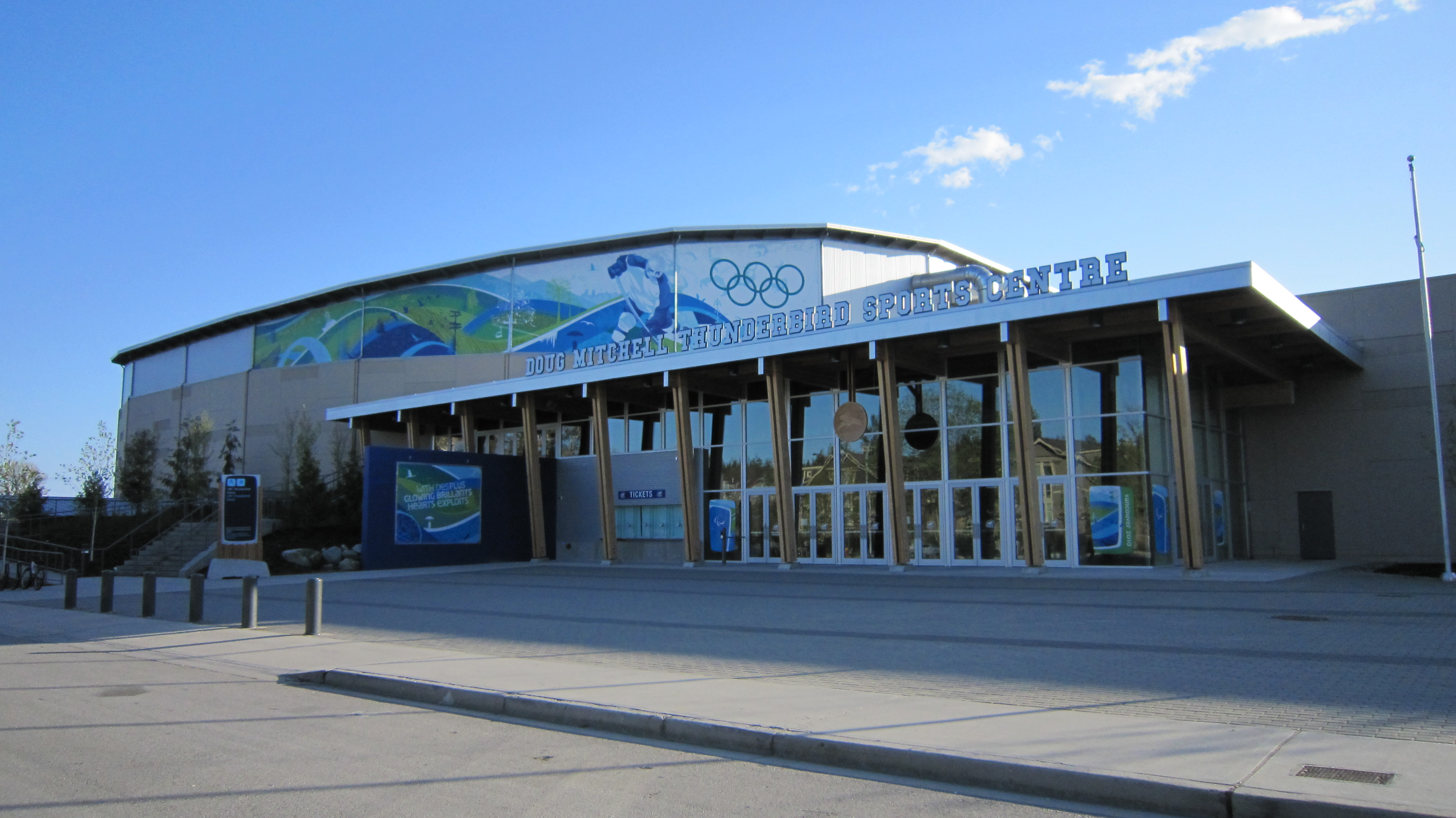
Doug Mitchell Sports Centre

Venue	Sport(s)	Ref.
Thunderbird Stadium	Football	
Ken Woods & Warren Fields (Note: Located at Thunderbird Park, UBC's sports complex.)	Soccer	
Doug Mitchell Thunderbird Sports Centre	Ice Hockey	
War Memorial Gymnasium	Basketball; Volleyball	
Wolfson East, Buck & Lord Fields	Rugby	
Gerald McGavin Rugby Centre	Rugby	
Tourmaline West Stadium	Baseball	
Wright Field	Field hockey	
John M.S. Lecky Boathouse	Rowing	
Rashpal Dhillon Oval	Track and field	
UBC Aquatics Centre	Swimming	

== National Championships ==
U Sports, NAIA, and Independent listed:

Assoc.	Sport	Titles	Winning years
U Sports	Swimming (women's)	26	2026, 2025, 2020, 2019, 2018, 2017, 2015, 2014, 2013, 2012, 2008, 2007, 2006, 2005, 2004, 2003, 2002, 2001, 2000, 1999, 1998, 1996, 1995, 1994, 1986, 1985
U Sports	Swimming (men's)	22	2026, 2025, 2023, 2022, 2020, 2019, 2018, 2017, 2015, 2012, 2009, 2007, 2006, 2005, 2004, 2003, 2002, 2001, 2000, 1999, 1998, 1965
U Sports	Field hockey (women's)	19	2017, 2016, 2015, 2014, 2013, 2012, 2011, 2009, 2006, 2004, 2003, 2001, 1999, 1998, 1990, 1983, 1982, 1980, 1978
U Sports	Soccer (men's)	14	2024, 2013, 2012, 2007, 2005, 1994, 1992, 1991, 1990, 1989, 1986, 1985, 1984, 1974
U Sports	Volleyball (women's)	14	2024, 2023, 2019, 2017, 2013, 2012, 2011, 2010, 2009, 2008, 1978, 1977, 1974, 1973
U Sports	Soccer (women's)	9	2024, 2023, 2019, 2015, 2006, 2003, 2002, 1993, 1987
U Sports	Basketball (women's)	6	2008, 2006, 2004, 1974, 1973, 1972
U Sports	Football	4	2015, 1997, 1986, 1982
U Sports	Volleyball (men's)	4	2018, 1983, 1976, 1967
U Sports	Basketball (men's)	2	1972, 1970
U Sports	Cross country (men's)	2	2023, 1993
U Sports	Cross country (women's)	1	2023
NAIA	Golf (women's)	8	2025, 2023, 2022, 2019, 2012, 2010, 2004, 2000
NAIA	Cross country (women's)	5	2017, 2016, 2014, 2013, 2012
NAIA	Track and field (women's)	5	2026, 2025, 2024, 2023, 2022, 2019
NAIA	Track and field (men's)	3	2025, 2019, 2017
NAIA	Golf (men's)	2	2023, 2008
NAIA	Cross country (men's)	1	2017
Independent (Note: Canadian University / College associations.)	Golf (women's)	19	2026, 2025, 2024, 2023, 2022, 2019, 2018, 2017, 2016, 2014, 2012, 2011, 2010, 2009, 2007, 2006, 2005, 2004, 2003
Independent	Rowing (men's)	10	2025, 2024, 2023, 2022, 2019, 2018, 2017, 2016, 2014, 2005
Independent	Golf (men's)	9	2025, 2024, 2022, 2019, 2016, 2015, 2013, 2009, 2008
Independent	Rugby (men's)	5	2023, 2022, 2021, 2018, 2017
Independent	Rowing (women's)	4	2021, 2019, 2018, 2004

== Fight song ==
UBC used to have a fight song "Hail UBC", written by Harold King in 1931.
A pep song with the same name "Hail UBC", written by Steve Chatman, was adopted in 2011. The lyrics go:

Hail to the Thunderbirds! Hail UBC!
Thunder and lightning — Onward to victory!
Hail to the Blue-and-Gold! Hail UBC!
U, B, C forever — Onward to victory!

== NCAA membership bid ==
In 2005, they applied to become members of the principal U.S. college sports governing body, the NCAA. They are not the first Canadian school to try to join the NCAA; in 2000, local rival Simon Fraser, then exclusively an NAIA member, sought to join the NCAA but was turned down. At the time, the NCAA's constitution prohibited non-U.S. schools from joining; however, some observers believed the real reason Simon Fraser was turned down was that the school sought to join as a Division II school, and the NCAA did not want to set a precedent with a lower-level school. UBC, on the other hand, was reportedly interested in joining Division I. UBC's athletic budget of approximately $4 million Canadian is dwarfed by those of schools in the Pac-12 Conference, the only BCS conference on the U.S. West Coast. However, at least two mid-major conferences with a West Coast presence, the West Coast Conference and Western Athletic Conference, had been suggested as possible future homes for the Thunderbirds.

The NCAA approved a change to its constitution on January 14, 2008 to allow Canadian schools to become members. Under a 10-year pilot program due to begin June 1, 2008, Canadian schools can join the NCAA as Division II members, and any school that meets the June 1 deadline for application can become a member as of the academic year immediately following the deadline. CIS has not officially indicated whether a school joining the NCAA under this program can retain its CIS membership. It was expected that both UBC and Simon Fraser would be among the first schools to apply for NCAA membership under this program. Simon Fraser did apply and was accepted, but in April 2009 UBC deferred a decision on applying. Since 2009, UBC has remained a CIS/USports member.

== Awards and honours ==
Since 1984, the Outstanding Female Athlete of the Year Award is named in honour of Marilyn Pomfret. Before her death in April 2019, she had spent 23 years at UBC, supporting the increase in funding and intramurals for women. Having worked as a coach, Pomfret also served as the Director of Women's Athletics from 1963 to 1969, followed by a second stint from 1972 to 1986. In addition, she served in the role of president of the Women's Athletic Directorate, creating and organizing several women's sporting events. Prior to her administrative career, Pomfret was a student-athlete, arriving to UBC in 1951, participating in basketball and volleyball.

=== Athletes of the Year ===
The Thunderbirds Female Athlete of the Year is awarded the Marilyn Pomfret Trophy. In recognition of the Male Athlete of the Year, the Bus Phillips Memorial Trophy is awarded.

List of UBC Thunderbirds Athletes of the Year since 2010
Year	Female athlete	Sport	Male athlete	Sport	Ref.
2009–10	Liz Cordonier	Volleyball	Josh Whyte	Basketball	
2010–11	Shanice Marcelle	Volleyball	Inaki Gomez	Track & Field	
2011–12	Robyn Pendleton; Kylie Barros	Field Hockey; Golf	Billy Greene; Tommy Gossland	Football; Swimming	
2012–13	Kris Young	Basketball	Gagan Dosanjh	Soccer	
2013–14	Lisa Barclay	Volleyball	Luc Bruchet	Track & Field	
2014–15	Maria Bernard	Track and field, Cross country	Coleman Allen; Conor Lillis-White	Swimming; Baseball	
2015–16	Hannah Haughn	Field Hockey	Michael O'Connor; Ben Thorne	Football; Track & Field	
2016–17	Danielle Brisebois	Volleyball	Yuri Kisil	Swimming	
2017–18	Kat Kennedy	Golf	John Gay	Track and Field	
2018–19	Emily Overholt; Kiera Van Ryk	Swimming; Volleyball	Markus Thormeyer	Swimming	
2019–20	Keylyn Filewich	Basketball	Kieran Lumb	Track & Field, Cross Country	
2020–21	Not Presented	-	Not Presented	-	
2021–22	Rylind MacKinnon	Ice Hockey	Rylan Toth	Ice Hockey	
2022–23	Glynis Sim	Track & Field, Cross Country	Theo Benedet	Football	
2023–24	Katalin Tolnai	Soccer	Garrett Rooker	Football	

=== Du Vivier Team of the Year ===
Since 2010

- 2010: Women's Volleyball
- 2011: Women's Volleyball and Women's Golf
- 2012: Women's Swimming
- 2013: Women's Ice Hockey
- 2015: Women's Cross Country and Men's Swimming
- 2016: Men's Football
- 2017: Men's Rugby
- 2019: Women's Volleyball
- 2020: Women's Golf
- 2021: Not Presented
- 2022: Women's Rowing
- 2023: Women's Golf and Women's Volleyball
- 2024: Women's Cross Country

=== Canada West Hall of Fame ===
- UBC Thunderettes Women's Basketball Team (1969–75) - 2021 Inductee: Canada West Hall of Fame
- Joanne Sargent - 2019 inductee: Canada West Hall of Fame

=== Sport BC Honours ===
- Danielle Brisebois, Volleyball: 2018 Sport BC University Athlete of the Year
- Deb Huband Coach, Basketball: 2018 Sport BC In Her Footsteps Honouree

== See also ==
- UBC Okanagan Heat
