= J. D. Jackson (basketball) =

Canadian / French basketball coach and former player

J.D. Jackson
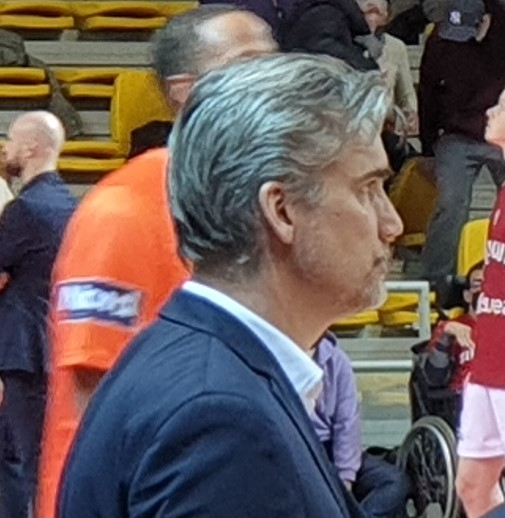
- Jackson with Gravelines in February 2022

Personal information
- Born: February 27, 1969 (age 57) Vernon, British Columbia, Canada
- Listed height: 6 ft 5 in (1.96 m)

Career information
- High school: Vernon Secondary School (Vernon, British Columbia)
- College: University of British Columbia (1986-88, 89-92)
- Playing career: 1992–2006
- Position: Shooting guard / small forward
- Number: 14, 6, 4
- Coaching career: 2008–present

Career history

Playing
- 1992-1994: Halifax Windjammers
- 1994-1995: Poissy-Chatou
- 1995-1996: Etoile Sportive Prisse Macon
- 1995-1996: Zalaegerszeg
- 1996-1997: Poissy-Chatou
- 1997-1999: Antibes
- 1999-2006: Le Mans

Coaching
- 2008–2014: Le Mans Sarthe Basket
- 2014–2017: ASVEL Villeurbanne
- 2021: Canadian Senior National Team (assistant)
- 2021–2022: BCM Gravelines-Dunkerque
- 2023–present: Antibes

Career highlights
- As player: 2x CIAU Player of the Year (1991, 1992); 4x CIAU All-Canadian (1988, 1990, 1991, 1992); Top 10 regular season scorer in CIAU history; CIAU Tournament All-star (1991); British Columbia University Athlete of the Year (1991); 2x Canada West Conference Player of the Year; 4x Canada West First-team All-star (1988, 1990, 1991, 1992); Bobby Gaul Award Recipient as UBC's Graduating Male Athlete of the Year (1992); Finished 3rd in overall MVP votes in France's Pro B professional league (1997); As coach: Coupe de France winner (2009); Leaders Cup winner (2009, 2014); France's Pro-A League champion (2016); Finalist in Pro-A League (2010, 2012)

John-David William "J.D." Jackson (born February 27, 1969) is a Canadian-French former professional basketball player and coach. His playing accomplishments include being the Canadian university ("CIAU") player of the year twice; a four-time CIAU All-Canadian; one of the highest scorers in CIAU history; and representing the Canadian national team in multiple international tournaments. As a coach in France's professional leagues, he has led multiple teams to championships, including the Coupe de France, the Leaders Cup and France's Pro-A championship.

== University ==
Before playing for the University of British Columbia ("UBC"), Jackson played at the high school level for Vernon Secondary. In his senior year, he was named as the MVP in five different tournaments in which Vernon participated. He was a British Columbia Provincial Championship All-star, with his team finishing second in the high school provincial tournament. As a senior, he was also named as Vernon Secondary's athlete of the year.

Jackson played for UBC for 5 seasons (1986-87; 1987-1988; 1989-92). At UBC, Jackson realized some of the most selective achievements in Canadian university basketball history. Jackson was named the CIAU player of the year twice (1991, 1992). Only seven other athletes have achieved this feat: David Coulthard (1979, 1981); Karl Tilleman (1982, 1983); Patrick Jebbison (1988, 1989); Eric Hinrichsen (1997, 1999); Osvaldo Jeanty (2006, 2007); Philip Scrubb (2012, 2013, 2014) and Kadre Gray (2018, 2019).

Jackson ranks 9th in CIAU history for all-time career points in regular season games, with 2,044 points. This record is notable because of the eight players ahead of Jackson, only two played fewer career regular season games than he did (Karl Tilleman and Richard Bohne).

Jackson was also a four-time CIAU All-Canadian, once as a Second-team All-Canadian (1988) and three times as a First-team All-Canadian (1990, 1991, 1992). Only 13 other athletes have been four-time All-Canadians (Rod Dean, Mickey Fox, David Coulthard, Karl Tilleman, John Carson, Byron Tokarchuk, John Stiefelmeyer, Tim Mau, Titus Channer, Charles Fortier, Andrew Spagrud, Tyson Hinz and Philip Scrubb. Only 17 other basketball players have been three-time First-Team All-Canadians. These feats are even more selective than being the CIAU MVP, of which there have been 41 in CIAU history.

Additionally, Jackson was named the BC University Athlete of the Year in 1991 and received UBC's Bobby Gaul Award as the university's graduating male athlete of the year in 1992.

Jackson also received numerous awards at the conference level. He was named the Canada West Conference player of the year twice (1991, 1992) and a First-team Canada West All-star four times (1988, 1990, 1991, 1992).

In this, Jackson set many UBC records, including most career points; most points in a season; most points in a game (51); most career three-pointers made; most career free-throws made; most First-team All-Canadian recognitions (record shared with Ron Thorsen); and most First-team Canada West recognitions.

UBC performed well under Jackson's leadership. In Jackson's 1986-87 freshman season, UBC finished second in the CIAU tournament, losing to Brandon University. UBC defeated Victoria University in the conference championship to reach the CIAU tournament, which is impressive given that in doing so, UBC ended Victoria's 7-year streak of consecutive CIAU championships under legendary coach Ken Shields. In the last month of this season, Jackson led all UBC players in scoring, despite being a 17-year-old freshman.

Furthermore, in the 1989-1990 season, UBC won the Canada West championship under Jackson's leadership. In the 1990-1991 season, Jackson led UBC to a 3rd place finish in the CIAU tournament. In this 1990-1991 season, Jackson was named a CIAU Tournament All-star.

=== University statistics ===
Year	Team	GP	3Pt	3Pt%	FG	FG%	FT	FT%	Rbds	RPG	Pts	PPG
1986-87	UBC	10	4-7	57.1	39-91	42.9	24-31	77.4	25	2.5	106	10.6
1987-88	UBC	20	46-94	48.9	163-335	48.7	98-119	82.4	105	5.2	470	23.5
1989-90	UBC	20	29-80	36.2	154-323	47.7	108-143	75.5	102	5.1	445	22.2
1990-91	UBC	20	39-113	34.5	192-380	50.5	119-142	83.8	142	7.1	542	27.1
1991-92	UBC	20	30-71	42.3	159-324	49.1	133-166	80.1	114	5.7	481	24.1
Career	UBC	90	148-365	40.5	707-1453	48.7	482-601	80.2	488	5.4	2044	22.7

== International ==
Jackson played for the Canadian national team from 1987-1994. He first represented Canada in the 1987 FIBA World Championship for Junior Men and then on the Senior Men's Team for the 1990 and 1994 FIBA World Championships and the 1992 FIBA Americas Championship for Men.

In the 1994 FIBA World Championship, Jackson was Canada's fourth overall scorer with 8.9 ppg. He played particularly well against Puerto Rico, where he was Canada's leading scorer with 20 points and also led Canada in assists. He also performed well against Argentina and Angola, where he was Canada's third-highest scorer in both games with 12 and 11 points, respectively. In the 1990 FIBA World Championship, Jackson was Canada's sixth overall scorer with 7.3 ppg.

In the 1987 FIBA World Championship for Junior Men, Jackson was Canada's fourth-leading scorer with 9.9 ppg. He performed well against Italy, where he led all Canadians with 19 points in their one-point win; in Canada's win over Puerto Rico, where Jackson scored 18 points; and in Canada's win over Brazil, where Jackson led Canada with 17 points.

== Professional playing career ==
Jackson had a successful professional career, primarily competing in France's Pro A and Pro B leagues.

Jackson began his professional career in Canada's World Basketball League, playing for the Halifax Windjammers in the 1992-1993 and 1993-1994 seasons.

He then moved to France and signed with the Pro-B team Poissy-Chatou for the 1994-1995 season. In this season, Jackson averaged 22.1 points per game, 7.6 rebounds per game and 4.8 assists per game.

To begin the 1995-1996 season, Jackson signed with Prisse Basket in France's NM1 (3rd tier) league; later, Jackson moved to Hungary and played the rest of the season for the club Zalaegerszeg.

Jackson moved back to France for the 1996-1997 season, signing again with the Pro B team Poissy Chatou. In this season, Jackson averaged 23.5 points per game, 7.3 rebounds per game and 4.1 assists per game, resulting in him finishing third in overall MVP votes in the Pro-B league.

For the 1997-1998 and 1998-1999 seasons, Jackson played for the club Olympique Antibes, which at the time was in the Pro-A league. For the 1999-2000 season, Jackson signed with the Pro A team Le Mans, where he played until 2006. In Pro A play, Jackson consistently averaged around 10 ppg per season.

=== Professional statistics ===
Year	Team	League	GP	PPG	RPG	Ast	Stl	FG%	3pt%
1992-93	Halifax Windjammers	World Basketball League							
1993-94	Halifax Windjammers	World Basketball League							
1994-95	Poissy-Chatou	France Prob B	21	22.1	7.6	4.8	2.7	44.4	35.6
1995-96	Prisse	France NM1							
1995-96	Zalaegerszeg	Hungary							
1996-97	Poissy-Chatou	France Prob B	25	23.5	7.3	4.1	2.1	52.7	36.0
1997-98	Antibes	Pro A	19	12.9	3.7	3.3	1.6	43.3	35.7
1998-99	Antibes	Pro A	30	7.4	2.9	3	1.8	41.4	28.0
1999-00	Le Mans	Pro A	30	10	3.7	3.2	1.6	46.5	36.5
2000-01	Le Mans	Pro A	29	11	4	3.9	1.8	45.9	32.9
2001-02	Le Mans	Pro A	29	13.1	3.5	3.7	1.9	57.0	41.4
2002-03	Le Mans	Pro A	28	9.9	3.6	3.9	1.8	47.1	41.1
2003-04	Le Mans	Pro A	34	9.4	3.4	3.9	1.4	45.2	40.7
2004-05	Le Mans	Pro A	34	9	4	2.7	1.1	45.9	41.5
2005-06	Le Mans	Pro A	27	4.5	1.9	2.7	1	34.5	23.5

== Coaching career ==
Jackson was head coach for the French Pro-A League Le Mans from 2008 to 2014, winning the Coupe de France (2009) and the Leaders Cup (2009, 2014). Under Jackson, Le Mans also were finalists in the Pro A League in 2010 and 2012.

Jackson was head coach of the Pro A League team ASVEL from 2014-2017. Under Jackson, ASVEL won the French Pro A Title in 2016. In early 2018, Tony Parker, president of ASVEL, dismissed Jackson as coach, despite ASVEL being ranked 8th at the time in the Pro A League with a 8-8 record.

In 2021, Jackson was an assistant coach for the Canadian senior men's national team for the FIBA America 2021 Qualifiers. Also in 2021, Jackson was hired as head coach for the Pro A League team BCM Gravelines-Dunkerque, but was later dismissed in 2022 when the team had a 3-6 record and ranked 14th of 18 teams in the Pro A League.

In 2023, Jackson was hired as head coach for the Pro B team Antibes Sharks, where he had played in the 1997-98 and 1998-99 seasons. He was tasked with "reviving" the Sharks after the previous coach was dismissed when the Sharks ranked 17th in the Pro B League with a 2-7 record. Jackson has been head coach of the Sharks to the present.

== Post-career recognition ==
Jackson has been inducted in the UBC Sports Hall of Fame (1998) and the BC Basketball Hall of Fame (2009).

== Personal life ==
Jackson was born in Burnaby, British Columbia on February 27, 1969. He grew up in Vernon, British Columbia where his father taught him how to play basketball.
