= Byron Tokarchuk =

Canadian basketball player

Personal information
- Born: Saskatoon, Saskatchewan, Canada
- Listed height: 6 ft 9 in (2.06 m)

Career information
- High school: Walter Murray Collegiate (Saskatoon, Saskatchewan)
- College: University of Saskatchewan (1983–1988)
- Position: Centre

Career highlights
- 4x CIAU First-team All-Canadian (1985, 1986, 1987, 1988); 3× Canada West Player of the Year (1985, 1987, 1988); 5x Canada West All-star (1984, 1985, 1986, 1987, 1988); University of Saskatchewan Male Athlete of the Year (1988)

Byron Tokarchuk is a former Canadian basketball player. Among his accomplishments, he was a four-time Canadian university ("CIAU") First-team All-Canadian, one of the only players in history to accomplish this feat. He is also one of two athletes in Canada West Conference history to be named player of the year three times.

== University career ==
Before university, Tokarchuk played at the high school level for Walter Murray Collegiate,

Tokarchuk played for the University of Saskatchewan Huskies for five seasons from 1983 to 1988. He was selected as a CIAU First-team All-Canadian four times. This is one of the most selective accomplishments in CIAU basketball history, with only five other athletes receiving such recognition (John Carson, David Coulthard, Karl Tilleman, John Stiefelmeyer and Philip Scrubb). Besides these athletes, only 8 have been four-time All-Canadians overall (First or Second Team) (Rod Dean, Mickey Fox, J.D. Jackson, Tim Mau, Titus Channer, Charles Fortier, Andrew Spagrud and Tyson Hinz). For context, this is more selective than being named the CIAU MVP in basketball, of which there have been 41 unique recipients.

In the 1987–88 season, Tokarchuk lead the entire CIAU in both regular season points (470) and regular season rebounds (177).

Tokarchuk also received recognition at the conference level. He was named Canada West player of the year three times (1985, 1987, 1988). He and Karl Tilleman are the only athletes to accomplish this feat.

Tokarchuk was also selected as a Canada West all-star in each of his five seasons at Saskatchewan, three times as a First-team All-star (1985, 1987, 1988) and twice as a Second-team All-star (1984, 1986). Tokarchuk is one of only seven athletes to be a five-time Canada West all-star (Robbie Parris, Eli Pasquale, Karl Tilleman, Spencer McKay, Andrew Spagrud and Jacob Doerksen). Tokarchuk is one of only 24 basketball players in history selected as a First-team Canada West All-stars three-times.

In the 1984–85 season, Tokarchuk led Canada West in scoring and rebounds.

When Tokarchuk graduated, he was the all-time leader in Huskies program history in points (3,572) and rebounds (1,739). These records stood for twenty years until they were broken by Andrew Spagrud in 2008. In the 1987–88 season, Tokarchuk also set the record for most regular season points in a single season by a Husky (470), which record also stood for nearly 20 years until Andrew Spagrud broke it in the 2006–2007 season.

In 1988, Tokarchuk was selected as the University of Saskatchewan Male Athlete of the Year.

The Huskies performed well under Tokarchuk's leadership. The Huskies finished fourth in the CIAU tournament in the 1984–85 season and fifth in 1987–88. The Huskies were the Canada West runner-ups in the 1985–86 and 1987–88 seasons.

=== Statistics ===
Year	Team	GP	FG	FG%	FT	FT%	Rbds	RPG	Pts	PPG
1983-84	Saskatchewan	9	44-104	42.3	15-32	46.9	65	7.2	103	11.4
1984-85	Saskatchewan	10	86-149	57.7	36-68	55.9	106	10.6	210	21.0
1985-86	Saskatchewan	10	68-216	54.0	39-55	70.9	89	8.9	175	17.5
1986-87	Saskatchewan	8	64-140	45.7	51-86	59.3	86	10.8	179	22.4
1987-88	Saskatchewan	20	177-311	56.9	116-182	63.7	177	8.8	470	23.5
Career	Saskatchewan	57	439-830	52.9	259-423	61.2	523	9.2	1137	19.9

== International career ==
Tokarchuk represented Canada on their national team in multiple tournaments. This included the 1983 Junior Men World Championship. Tokarchuk played well in this tournament, being Canada's second overall leading scorer with 9.4 ppg. In this tournament, Tokarchuk played well in individual games: he was Canada's second leading scorer against Argentina with 18 points; Canada's leading scorer against the Dominican Republic with 14 points; Canada's second leading scorer against Angola with 10 points; and Canada's second leading scorer against Australia with 10 points.

Tokarchuk also represented Canada at the 1985 World Student Games, where Canada won the bronze medal.

== Professional career ==
Tokarchuk played professionally in Mexico in 1988 and later played professionally in the United Arab Emirates. Tokarchuk was also invited to participate in the San Antonio Spurs rookie camp in 1989.

== Post-career recognition ==
Tokarchuk was inducted into the University of Saskatchewan's Sports Wall of Fame in 1994.
