= David Coulthard (basketball) =

Former Canadian basketball player

Personal information
- Listed height: 6 ft 3 in (1.91 m)

Career information
- High school: Glendale Secondary School (Hamilton, Ontario)
- College: York University (1977–1982)
- NBA draft: 1982: 10th round, 214th overall pick
- Drafted by: Detroit Pistons
- Position: Shooting guard
- Number: 15

Career highlights
- 5× CIAU All-Canadian (1978, 1979, 1980, 1981, 1982); 2× CIAU Player of the Year (1979, 1981); 2× CIAU Tournament All-star (1978, 1980); 2× OUA East Player of the Year (1981, 1982); 5× OUA East First Team All-star (1978, 1979, 1980, 1981, 1982); OUAA Tournament MVP (1978); 2× York University Male Athlete of the Year (1980, 1982)
- Stats at Basketball Reference

David Coulthard is a Canadian former basketball player. He is one of only two Canadian university ("CIAU") basketball players to be a five-time All-Canadian. He also was awarded the CIAU MVP award twice, the first to accomplish that feat. He was drafted by the Detroit Pistons in the 1982 NBA Draft.

== University ==
Coulthard played for York University for five seasons from 1977 to 1982. Coulthard was named an All-Canadian in each of these five seasons, once as a Second Team All-Canadian (1978) and four times as a First Team All-Canadian (1979, 1980, 1981, 1982). Only one other athlete in Canadian university basketball history, John Carson, was a five-time All Canadian, with Carson being the only five-time First Team All-Canadian. Besides Coulthard and Carson, only four other athletes were four-time First Team All-Canadians: Karl Tilleman, Byron Tokarchuk, John Stiefelmeyer and Philip Scrubb. And besides these athletes, only 8 have been four-time All-Canadians overall (First or Second Team): Rod Dean, Mickey Fox, J.D. Jackson, Tim Mau, Titus Channer, Charles Fortier, Andrew Spagrud and Tyson Hinz.

Coulthard also received the Mike Moser trophy as the CIAU's Most Outstanding Player twice (1979, 1981), the first athlete to accomplish this feat. For context, only seven other athletes have since achieved this feat: Karl Tilleman (1982, 1983), Patrick Jebbison (1988, 1989), J.D. Jackson (1991, 1992), Eric Hinrichsen (1997, 1999), Osvaldo Jeanty (2006, 2007), Philip Scrubb (2012, 2013, 2014) and Kadre Gray (2018, 2019).

Coulthard was named a CIAU tournament all-star twice (1978, 1980). He was named the OUA East Conference MVP twice (1981, 1982), an OUA East First Team All-star five times (1978, 1979, 1980, 1981, 1982) and MVP of the OUA tournament (1978). Coulthard was also named York's male athlete of the year twice (1980, 1982).

Under Coulthard's leadership, the York Lions also performed well. They obtained a third-place finish in the CIAU tournament twice (1978, 1979), another CIAU top 8 placement (1982) and were OUA Conference champions four times.

=== University statistics ===
Year	Team	GP	FG	FG%	FT	FT%	Rbds	RPG	Pts	PPG
1977-78	York	12	77-130	59.2	20-28	71.4	25	2.1	174	14.5
1978-79	York	12	87-168	51.8	19-28	67.9	62	5.2	193	16.1
1979-80	York	12	117-215	54.4	27-33	81.8	39	3.2	261	21.8
1980-81	York	9	65-130	50.0	13-14	92.9	49	5.4	143	15.9
1981-82	York	12	161-280	57.5	40-55	72.7	67	5.6	362	30.2
Career	York	57	507-923	54.9	119-158	75.3	242	4.2	1133	19.9

== Professional ==
Coulthard was drafted by the Detroit Pistons in the 10th round of the 1982 NBA Draft as the 214th overall pick.

== Post-career recognition ==
Coulthard was inducted into the York University Athletics Hall of Fame in 2001.

== Personal life ==
Coulthard's father is Bill Coulthard, who competed in the 1952 Olympics, is credited for pioneering the modern one-handed jump shot in Ontario (as compared to the two-handed shot which was standard at the time) and has been inducted into the Canada Basketball Hall of Fame. Coulthard's brother, Chris, played for what was then Waterloo Lutheran and Coulthard's other brother, Bruce, played briefly in Buffalo, NY, then for Windsor University and later with the Canadian national team.

Coulthard's wife, Terri Carson Coulthard, played basketball for McMaster University. Their sons Will and Owen played basketball for Wilfrid Laurier University.

Coulthard's nephew, Brett Coulthard (Chris's son) also played for Wilfrid Laurier and Coulthard's niece, Sarah Coulthard (Bruce's daughter) played for Western University.
