= Robbie Parris =

Canadian basketball player and coach

Personal information
- Born: Victoria, British Columbia, Canada
- Listed height: 5 ft 6 in (1.68 m)

Career information
- High school: Oak Bay High School (Oak Bay, British Columbia)
- College: University of Victoria (1974–1979)
- Position: Point guard
- Number: 20

Career highlights
- 5× Canada West All-star (1975, 1976, 1977, 1978, 1979); Canadian University ("CIAU") All-Canadian (1979); CIAU Tournament All-star (1979); Graduated from UVic with most regular season and playoff points; University of Victoria Sports Hall of Fame (2005); Oak Bay High School Sports Hall of Fame

Robbie Parris is a former Canadian basketball player and coach. He was a five-time Canada West all-star, one of the only athletes in history to accomplish this feat. He was also a Canadian University ("CIAU") Second-team All-Canadian and a CIAU tournament all-star.

== High school ==
Parris played at the high school level at Oak Bay High School. In his senior year (1974), he was named MVP of the Island Championships and was named a first-team All-Provincial All-star. He and his teammates won the BC high school championships twice (1973, 1974).

== University ==
Parris played for the University of Victoria for five seasons from 1974-1979. He has been described as the point-guard template and precursor to Canadian greats Eli Pasquale and Steve Nash.

Parris was named a Canada West All-star in each of his five seasons: three times as a Second-team all-star (1975, 1976, 1977) and twice as a First-team all-star (1978, 1979). Only six other athletes in history have been five-time Canada West all-stars: Eli Pasquale, Karl Tilleman, Spencer McKay, Byron Tokarchuk, Andrew Spagrud and Jacob Doerksen.

In his final season (1979), Parris was named as a Second-team All-Canadian and as CIAU tournament all-star.

Parris graduated with the most regular season points in University of Victoria history and currently ranks 10th overall. He also graduated with the most career playoff points in Victoria Vikes history and currently ranks 9th overall.

Parris was named University of Victoria's MVP and Most Inspirational player several times.

The Victoria Vikes performed well under Parris' leadership. In 1979, Victoria finished second in the CIAU tournament and were the Canada West champions. In 1978, the Vikes were CIAU semifinalists and also were the Canada West champions.

== Coaching ==
Parris returned to Oak Bay High School as an assistant coach to the senior boys team, where they won three straight Island Championships from 2016-18.

== Post-career recognition ==
In 2005, Parris was inducted into the University of Victoria Sports Hall of Fame. He was also inducted into the Oak Bay High School Sports Hall of Fame.

Parris' jersey (#20) was retired by the university in 2004, being the first basketball player in the university's history to have his jersey retired.
