= John Stiefelmeyer =

Former Canadian basketball player

Personal information
- Listed height: 6 ft 6 in (1.98 m)

Career information
- High school: Stamford Collegiate (Niagara Falls, Ontario)
- College: Western University (1986–1991)
- Position: Power forward
- Number: 41

Career highlights
- CIAU Player of the Year (1990); 4× CIAU First Team All-Canadian (1988, 1989, 1990, 1991); CIAU Tournament MVP (1991); CIAU Tournament All-star (1991); 3× OUA West MVP (1988, 1989, 1991); 4× OUA West First Team All-star (1988, 1989, 1990, 1991); 2× OUA Tournament MVP (1988, 1989); Western University Male Athlete of the Year (1991); Western University Outstanding Athlete & Scholar (1991)

John Stiefelmeyer is a Canadian former basketball player. Among his accomplishments, he was a four-time Canadian university ("CIAU") First Team All-Canadian; was the CIAU MVP in 1991; and a CIAU champion.

== University ==
Before university, Stiefelmeyer played for Stamford Collegiate high school.

Stiefelmeyer played for Western University for five seasons from 1986 to 1991. He was a CIAU First Team All-Canadian four times (1998, 1989, 1990, 1991). Only five other athletes in history besides Stiefelmeyer have accomplished this feat: John Carson, David Coulthard, Karl Tilleman, Byron Tokarchuk and Philip Scrubb. And besides these athletes, only 8 have been four-time All-Canadians overall (First or Second Team): Rod Dean, Mickey Fox, J.D. Jackson, Tim Mau, Titus Channer, Charles Fortier, Andrew Spagrud and Tyson Hinz.

In 1991, Stiefelmeyer received the Mike Moser trophy as the CIAU's most outstanding male basketball player. In 1991, he also was named the CIAU tournament MVP and a CIAU tournament all-star.

Stiefelmeyer was named the OUA West Conference MVP three times (1988, 1989, 1991); an OUA West First Team All-star four times (1988, 1989, 1990, 1991); and OUA tournament MVP twice (1988, 1989).

In 1991, Stiefelmeyer was named Western University's male athlete of the year and received the university's Outstanding Athlete & Scholar Award. He was also named Western's male basketball team MVP three times (1988, 1989, 1991).

Under Stiefelmeyer's leadership, the Western Mustangs performed well. They were the CIAU national champions in 1991, the only occasion in which Western won the national title. They were the OUA West champions three times and similarly were the OUA champions three times (1988, 1989, 1991).

=== University statistics ===
Year	Team	GP	3pt	3pt%	FG	FG%	FT	FT%	Rbds	RPG	Pts	PPG
1986-87	Western	12	1-1	100.0	74-143	51.7	38-48	79.2	85	7.1	187	15.6
1987-88	Western	11	0-0	0.0	119-194	61.3	46-53	86.8	81	7.4	284	25.8
1988-89	Western	14	8-12	66.7	131-214	61.2	93-113	82.3	89	6.4	363	25.9
1989-90	Western	14	6-15	40.0	101-183	55.2	56-70	80.0	112	8.0	264	18.9
1990-91	Western	11	12-24	50.0	85-165	51.5	37-42	88.1	80	7.3	219	19.9
Career	Western	62	27-52	51.9	510-899	56.7	270-326	82.8	447	7.2	1317	21.2

== Post-career recognition ==
Steifelmeyer was inducted into Western University's Men's Basketball Wall of Honour in 2002; in the Western Mustangs Backcourt Club (Western men's basketball alumni group) Hall of Fame in 2009; and in Stamford Collegiate High School's Sports Wall of Fame.
