= John Carson (basketball) =

Former Canadian university and professional basketball player

Personal information
- Born: September 20, 1959 (age 67) Huntsville, North Carolina, US
- Listed height: 6 ft 4 in (1.93 m)

Career information
- College: Brandon University (1982–1987) (Brandon, Manitoba, Canada)
- Position: Power forward
- Number: 42, 52

Career history
- 1987-88: St. Declan's Dublin, Ireland
- 1988: Calgary 88's
- 1991: Saskatoon Slam

Career highlights
- CIAU Player of the Year (1986); 5x CIAU First Team All-Canadian (1983, 1984, 1985, 1986, 1987); Great Plains Athletic Conference (GPAC) Player of the Year (1983, 1984, 1985, 1986); CIAU Tournament Champion (1987); CIAU Tournament MVP (1987); 2x CIAU Tournament All-Star (1984, 1987); CIAU Scoring Champion (27.2 ppg) (1985-86 season); GPAC Scoring Champion (23.3 ppg) (1986-87 season); 11x Tournament MVP; 21x Tournament All-Star

John Carson (born September 20, 1959) is a former Canadian university and professional basketball player. He was a five-time Canadian university ("CIAU") First Team All-Canadian, the only player in Canadian university basketball history to achieve this feat. In the 1985–86 season, he was named the CIAU's player of the year and in this year, lead the CIAU in scoring with 27.2 ppg. He was named the Great Plains Athletic Conference ("GPAC") player of the year four consecutive years (1983-1986); was a five-time GPAC All-Star; and in the 1986–87 season, he led the GPAC in scoring with 23.3 ppg. In the 1986–87 season, he led Brandon University to its first basketball national championship and in this year, was named the CIAU National Tournament MVP. He finished his university career with 4,259 points and 1,179 rebounds. After university, he enjoyed a successful professional career in Ireland and in the World Basketball League with the Calgary 88's and Saskatoon Slam.

Carson has been inducted into the Canada West Hall of Fame, Manitoba Sports Hall of Fame, Manitoba Basketball Hall of Fame, and Brandon University Sports Hall of Fame.

== University career ==
Carson played for the Brandon University Bobcats from 1982 to 1987. He was named a five-time First Team CIAU All-Canadian, the only athlete in Canadian university basketball history to achieve this accomplishment. For context, only one other athlete in Canadian basketball university history, David Coulthard, was a five-time All-Canadian; however, Coulthard's first All-Canadian award was to the Second Team. Further, besides Carson and Coulthard, only four other athletes were four-time First Team All-Canadians: Karl Tilleman, Byron Tokarchuk, John Stiefelmeyer and Philip Scrubb. And besides these athletes, only 8 have been four-time All-Canadians overall (First or Second Team): Rod Dean, Mickey Fox, J.D. Jackson, Tim Mau, Titus Channer, Charles Fortier, Andrew Spagrud and Tyson Hinz.

In the 1985–96 season, Carson was awarded the CIAU's Mike Moser award as the nation's player of the year. He was the first of only three Brandon Bobcats to receive the award. That year, Carson led the CIAU in scoring with a 27.2 ppg average.

In his senior season in 1987, Carson led the Bobcats to win the program's first national championship. This was also only the second time in which a team from Manitoba won the national championship, the first being the Manitoba Bisons in 1976 led by Martin Riley. Carson played an "instrumental role" in the Bobcats qualifying for the CIAU tournament that year; he scored 34 points in the GPAC championship game, resulting in a win for Brandon and subsequent qualification for the national tournament.

In this 1987 national championship game, which was also the final game of Carson's university career, Carson finished with a game-high 38 points along with a steal and an "emphatic dunk" in the closing seconds. This championship game was also historic in that it was the first time in CIAU basketball history in which a team started five black players in the national championship game. This year, Carson was named the CIAU tournament MVP. This was the second time Carson was named to the CIAU Tournament All-Star team, the first being in 1984.

Additionally, Carson was named the GPAC Player of the Year four consecutive seasons (1983-1986). He was named a GPAC All-Star all five seasons of his university career. In the 1986–87 season, Carson was the GPAC scoring champion with a 23.3 ppg average.

Carson finished his university career with 4,259 career points and 1,179 rebounds. Throughout all of the different tournaments in which he competed as a Bobcat, Carson was named as a tournament all-star 21 times and tournament MVP 11 times.

== Professional career ==
After his university career, Carson enjoyed a successful professional career in Ireland and in the World Basketball League with the Calgary 88's and the Saskatoon Slam.

== Post-career Awards ==
Carson was inducted into the Canada West Hall of Fame in its first induction class (2019); the Manitoba Sports Hall of Fame (2007); the Manitoba Basketball Hall of Fame (2001); the Brandon University Sports Hall of Fame (1996); and has been nominated to the Canada Basketball Hall of Fame. In 1986, the university retired his number 42, being the first Bobcat player to have his uniform retired.

In addition to his personal hall of fame inductions, his 1987 Bobcats team, along with the 1988 and 1989 Bobcats teams after his graduation, were inducted into the Manitoba Sports Hall of Fame (2019); the Manitoba Basketball Hall of Fame (2005); and the Brandon University Sports Hall of Fame (2014).

== Personal life ==
Carson was born on September 20, 1959. He is originally from Huntsville, North Carolina, USA. Carson later settled in Calgary and returns to Brandon often to partake in alumni games and support the Bobcat program by being involved in youth camps and homecoming events.
