= Rick Hansen Secondary School =

Rick Hansen Secondary School may refer to:

- Rick Hansen Secondary School (Abbotsford), in British Columbia, Canada
- Rick Hansen Secondary School (Mississauga), in Ontario, Canada
