= David Turcotte =

Canadian basketball player (born 1965)

Personal information
- Born: July 10, 1965 (age 61) Ottawa, Ontario, Canada
- Listed height: 6 ft 3 in (1.91 m)
- Listed weight: 210 lb (95 kg)

Career information
- High school: Lockerby Composite School (Greater Sudbury, Ontario)
- College: Colorado State University (1984–1988); BYU Law (1989-1992, not as a player)
- Position: Guard
- Number: 5, 25

Career highlights
- Olympian (1988); 5th highest career points at Colorado State (1,508); 6th higher career assists at Colorado (344); 2x WAC Honorable Mention; WAC All-Academic All-star (1988)

David Turcotte (born July 10, 1965) is a former Canadian basketball player, Olympian, lawyer and entrepreneur. He represented Canada in many international tournaments, including the 1988 Olympics, and was one of the most accomplished players in Colorado State's history.

== International career ==
Turcotte represented Canada on their national team for 12 years. This included many international tournaments, including the 1988 Olympics; the 1986 FIBA World Championship; the 1988 American Olympic Qualifying Tournament; the 1989 FIBA Americas Championship; the 1992 FIBA Americas Championship; the 1993 FIBA Americans Championship; and the 1983 Junior Men World Championship.

Turcotte performed well for Canada. In the 1988 Olympics, Turcotte had notable performances against Brazil with 13 points and against China, where he was Canada's third leading scorer with 14 points. Canada finished 6th overall in these Olympics, the highest Canada has finished in the Olympics in over 30 years until Canada finished 5th overall in the 2024 Olympics.

In the 1992 FIBA Americas Championship, Turcotte was Canada's leading scorer with 15 ppg. Canada finished 5th overall in this tournament.

In the 1989 FIBA Americas Championship, Turcotte was Canada's second leading scorer with 12.2 ppg. Canada finished 5th in this tournament as well.

In the 1993 FIBA Americas Championship, Turcotte was Canada's sixth leading scorer with 9.8 ppg. Canada finished 7th overall in this tournament.

In the 1988 American Qualifying tournament, Turcotte had a notable performance in Canada's game against Brazil, where his defensive efforts held Oscar Schmidt (the all-time leading scorer in Olympic history) to only three points in 18 minutes in the second half of the game, which helped Turcotte solidify his position on Canada's 1988 Olympic team.

Turcotte also led all Canadian scorers in the 1983 Junior Men World tournament with 16.4 ppg. Canada's second-leading scorer was Byron Tokarchuk with 9.4 ppg. Notable performances from Turcotte include Canada's game against Argentina, in which he led all Canadians in scoring with 21 points; against Yugoslavia, in which he led all Canadians with 24 points; against Uruguay, in which he led all Canadians with 25 points; and against China, in which he was Canada's second-leading scorer with 16 points.

== University ==
Before attending university, Turcotte played at the high school level at Lockerby Composite School in Greater Sudbury, Ontario. In high school, he received a varsity letter in six sports and was noted for his skill in hockey. He led the school to three straight regional titles in basketball and set the school's all-time basketball scoring record.

Turcotte started for Colorado State for four years. He is one the highest performing basketball players in Colorado State history. His 1,508 career points are the 5th highest in CSU history and the most by a guard. He set the school's record for most games played with 123, which has since been broken by Pat Durham's 125. His 344 career assists were second all-time when he graduated and are now sixth overall. His 120 career three-point field goals made was the highest in school history when he graduated and now 9th overall. His 42.6% career three-point percentage was also the highest when he graduated and now sevent overall. His 80.6% free throw percentage in 1988 was the highest of any individual season in CSU history when he graduated and now ranks 10th overall. He also set the CSU record for most three-point field goals made in a single game with 7 (first against Drexel in 1986 and then against Wyoming in 1987), which has since been broken by David Evans' 8 against East Carolina in 1995, Aki Palmer's 9 against Michigan in 2000 and Sean Morris' 9 against UNLV in 2005.

In 1988, he led the Rams to a third-place finish in the NIT.

Turcotte was also a two-time WAC honorable mention and in 1988 was an all-WAC academic all-star.

=== University statistics ===
Year	Team	GP	FG	FGA	FG%	3P	3PA	3P%	2P	2PA	2P%	FT	FTA	FT%	RPG	Ast	Stl	PPG
1984-85	Colorado State	30	3.1	5.8	54.3%						54.3%	1.3	1.7	75.0%	2.4	2.2	.4	7.6
1985-86	Colorado State	29	4.5	8.6	52.6%						52.6%	2.3	3.0	76.1%	3.6	3.1	.8	11.3
1986-87	Colorado State	29	5.6	11.6	48.4%	1.9	4.4	43.8%	3.7	7.1	51.2%	2.4	3.1	79.8%	4.0	2.5	1.0	15.6
1987-88	Colorado State	35	5.0	11.2	44.6%	1.8	4.4	41.6%	3.2	6.8	46.6%	2.5	3.1	80.6%	3.2	3.3	.9	14.3
Career	Colorado State	123	4.6	9.3	48.9%	1.9	4.4	42.6%	3.4	7.0	51.0%	2.1	2.7	78.3%	3.3	2.8	.8	12.3

== Legal career ==
Turcotte graduated from Colorado State in 1988 with a degree in economics and finance. He later graduated from BYU Law School in 1993. He retired from professional sports in 1995.

His practice as a lawyer focuses on business, contract and real estate litigation. He later ventured into real estate development and business start-ups. Turcotte presided over or participated in the startup and financing of over 100 companies and many real estate development projects in the U.S. and Costa Rica.

== Development / coaching ==
Turcotte co-founded the Canadian National Basketball Teams Alumni Association. This organization aims to document every player who has represented Canada basketball; connect Canada Basketball alumni; foster mentor relationships among alumni; provide support to alumni; and create a physical Canada Basketball hall of fame location.

Turcotte also served as an assistant coach to the American Basketball Association's Salt Lake Saints.

== Personal life ==
Turcotte was born on July 10, 1965 in Ottawa, Ontario. He is a Sudbury native. He did not begin playing basketball until the eighth grade.
