= Eli Pasquale =

Canadian basketball player (1960–2019)

Personal information
- Born: August 24, 1960 Sudbury, Ontario, Canada
- Died: November 4, 2019 (aged 59)
- Listed height: 6 ft 1 in (1.85 m)
- Listed weight: 190 lb (86 kg)

Career information
- High school: Lockerby Composite School (Sudbury, Ontario)
- College: University of Victoria (1980–1984)
- NBA draft: 1984: 5th round, 106th overall pick
- Drafted by: Seattle SuperSonics
- Position: Point guard
- Number: 13, 6

Career highlights
- CIAU Player of the Year (1984); 3× CIAU First Team All-Canadian (1981-1984); 2× CIAU National Tournament MVP (1981, 1983); 3× CIAU National Tournament All-Star (1981, 1983, 1984); 5x CIAU National Champion (1980-1984); 5× CWUAA First Team All-Star (1981–1984)
- Stats at Basketball Reference

Ilario Enrico "Eli" Pasquale (August 24, 1960 – November 4, 2019) was a Canadian basketball player and two-time Olympian. Considered one of the best basketball players in Canada's history, Pasquale was the starting point guard and co-captain of the Canada men's national basketball team. During this time, Pasquale competed in the 1984 and 1988 Olympics, two World Student Games, four FIBA World Championships and two Pan American Games.

In 1984, Pasquale was drafted by the Seattle SuperSonics as the 106th overall pick. Pasquale later played professionally in Argentina, West Germany and Switzerland.

During university, Pasquale led the University of Victoria to 5 straight national championships. Pasquale was the university's all-time leading scorer when he graduated. In 1984, he was awarded the Mike Moser Trophy as the male Canadian university player of the year. Pasquale was also a three-time First-Team All-Canadian (1981–1984), was named the CIAU national tournament MVP two times (1981, 1983), and was named as CIAU tournament all-star three times (1981, 1983, 1984) and five-time first team Canada West all-star.

== International career ==
Pasquale was a member of the Canadian men's national basketball team for over 15 years. Pasquale was the starting point guard and co-captain of this Canadian team.

Pasquale represented Canada in the 1984 and 1988 Olympics. The 1984 Olympics were notable because Canada finished 4th overall, narrowly missing a medal. In 1988, Canada finished respectably in 6th.

This 1984 bronze-medal game constituted the only time in 80+ years where Canada had a legitimate chance of winning an Olympic medal in basketball. In this bronze medal game was highly competitive, being tied 18 times with 12 lead changes, with Canada being within one point with less than a minute of play remaining. Pasquale played well in this crucial game in Canadian basketball history, leading Canada in points (16) and assists (5), while also obtaining 6 rebounds.

Pasquale represented Canada in the 1983 and 1985 World Student Games. In the 1983 World Student Games hosted in Edmonton, Alberta, the Canadian team won the gold medal. This constituted one of the finest moments in Canadian basketball history, being the only time in which Canada has won the gold medal in an international basketball tournament. In the semifinals of this tournament, Canada defeated a talented US team led by future NBA legends Charles Barkley and Karl Malone. In the 1985 World Student Games, Canada won the bronze medal.

Pasquale competed for Canada in four FIBA World Championships, where in 1982, Canada placed 4th. Pasquale also competed for Canada in two Pan American games where in 1983, Canada finished fourth and in 1987, Canada finished 5th.

After a 5-year absence, in 1997 Pasquale represented Canada in the Tournament of the Americas that qualified Canada for the 1998 FIBA World Championship.

== Professional career ==
In 1984, Pasquale was drafted by the Seattle SuperSonics in the 5th round as the 106th overall pick. He played three exhibition games with the team before being released. The following year, Pasquale nearly made the Chicago Bulls, who were looking for someone to play in the backcourt beside Michael Jordan. Pasquale had impressed the Bulls, but ultimately, they chose with American John Paxson. Pasquale was their final cut.

Pasquale played in the Amateur Athletic Union for Seattle and the Los Angeles summer pro league. He played professionally in Argentina (1986), in West Germany (1989) and in Switzerland (1990).

== University ==
Legendary coach Ken Shields described Pasquale as "the face of UVic basketball". Pasquale played for UVic for 5 years, leading the team to 5-straight national championships. Pasquale is believed to be the first athlete in all of Canadian university sports history to win five consequtive national championships. He is only one of five athletes to win five national titles in Canadian university sports. Pasquale and his UVic team were five-time Canada West champions as well, going 75–5 against Canada West teams in regular season play during his time at UVic.

Pasquale was the all-time leading scorer at UVic when he graduated. In 1984, he was awarded the Mike Moser Memorial Trophy as CIAU's outstanding men's basketball player. Pasquale was a three-time First-team All Canadian (1981–1984), a two-time CIAU national tournament MVP (1981, 1983) and a three-time CIAU national tournament all-star. (1981, 1983, 1984) Besides Pasquale, only five other athletes in Canada basketball history have received the CIAU national tournament MVP twice: Mickey Fox, Osvaldo Jeanty, Michael Smart, Tyson Hinz and Philip Scrubb.

Since the Canada West conference was formed in the 1972–73 season, Pasquale is the only five-time first team all-star in Canada West basketball history. Besides Pasquale, only five other athletes in basketball were four-time Canada West first team all-stars: Karl Tilleman, J.D. Jackson, Spencer McKay, Danny Balderson and Andrew Spagrud.

In 1982, he was named the BC University Athlete of the Year. Twice, he was named UVic's top male athlete.

== Post career ==
Pasquale was inducted into the Canada Basketball Hall of Fame in 2003. In 2021, he was inducted into the BC Sports Hall of Fame. He was inducted into the Canada West Hall of Fame in its 2020-21 induction class. In 2005, he was inducted into the University of Victoria Athletic Hall of Fame. Similarly, in 2006 his jersey number, 13, was retired by the university, being only one of three athletes thus honored by the university. In 2014 he was inducted into the Greater Victoria Sports Hall of Fame and in 2008 he was inducted into the Sudbury Ontario Sports Hall of Fame.

Additionally, the 1979-86 UVic Men's Basketball teams were inducted into the Canada West Hall of Fame (2019-2020 induction class); the 1979-80 UVic team was inducted into the BC Sports Hall of Fame (2020); and the 1982-1983 UVic team was inducted into the University of Victoria Sports Hall of Fame (2023), with Pasquale being recognized as a team member of each of these team inductions.

In retirement, Eli focused his time on his young family and his immensely popular basketball camps. Beginning in 1985 and right up to his death in 2019, he ran youth development camps all over BC, particularly in Victoria. Thousands of BC kids received their start in basketball through Eli's camps.

== Personal life ==
Pasquale was born on August 24, 1960, in Sudbury, Ontario, Canada. He grew up in Gatchell, Ontario, a predominantly Italian neighbourhood of Sudbury. He played his first organized basketball in Grade 8 on his school team, St. Francis School. By grade 10, Pasquale's height was a mere 5 feet, 3 inches.

On November 4, 2019, Pasquale died from esophageal cancer.

== Sources ==
- elipasquale.com
- frozenhoops.com
- Evans, Hilary; Gjerde, Arild; Heijmans, Jeroen; Mallon, Bill; et al. "Eli Pasquale". Olympics at Sports-Reference.com. Sports Reference LLC. Archived from the original on 2011-05-19.
