= Patrick Jebbison =

Former Canadian Basketball Player

Personal information
- Born: March 26, 1964 (age 62)
- Listed height: 6 ft 5 in (1.96 m)

Career information
- High school: Martingrove Collegiate Institute (Etobicoke, Ontario, Canada)
- College: Brandon University (1984–1989)
- Position: Forward
- Number: 44

Career highlights
- 2× CIAU Player of the Year (1988, 1989); 2× CIAU First Team All-Canadian (1988, 1989); CIAU All-Canadian Honourable Mention (1987); 3x CIAU Champion (1987, 1988, 1989); 3x CIAU Tournament All-star (1987, 1988, 1989); 2x Great Plains Athletic Conference("GPAC") MVP (1988, 1989); 3x GPAC First-team All-star (1987, 1988, 1989); GPAC Second-team All-star (1986); GPAC All-rookie team (1985)

Patrick Jebbison (born March 26, 1964) is a former Canadian basketball player. Among his accomplishments, he was the Canadian University ("CIAU") MVP twice (1988, 1989), one of the only athletes in history to accomplish this feat.

== University ==
Before university, Jebbison played at the high school level at Martingrove Collegiate Institute in Etobicoke, Ontario before being recruited by Brandon University's legendary head coach Jerry Hemmings.

Jebbison played for the Brandon Bobcats for five seasons from 1984 to 1989. Notably, he was named the CIAU's player of the year twice (1988, 1989). This is a selective feat; only 7 other athletes in Canadian university basketball history have also been named player of the year twice: David Coulthard (1979, 1981), Karl Tilleman (1982, 1983), J. D. Jackson (1991, 1992), Eric Hinrichsen (1997, 1999), Osvaldo Jeanty (2006, 2007), Philip Scrubb (2012, 2013, 2014) and Kadre Gray (2018, 2019).

At Brandon, Jebbison also was named a CIAU First-team All-Canadian twice (1988, 1989) and an All-Canadian Honourable Mention the prior year (1987).

Jebbison helped lead Brandon to three CIAU national championships (1987, 1988, 1989), which included Brandon's first national championship in program history. Jebbison was named a CIAU tournament all-star in each of these tournament runs. In his final championship game (and thus final university game), Jebbison had a key block with six seconds left to secure Brandon's 74–73 victory over Victoria University.

Jebbison also received recognition at the conference level. He was named the Great Plains Athletic Conference ("GPAC") MVP twice (1988, 1989) and a GPAC First-team all-star three times (1987, 1988, 1989). In the 1986–87 season, Jebbison led the GPAC conference in field goal percentage (64%). In his freshman season (1984–85), Jebbison was named to the GPAC conference all-rookie team. In his sophomore season (1985–86), Jebbison was named as a GPAC conference Second-team all-star.

In his second-to-last season (1987–88), Jebbison averaged 18.8 points per game and 6.3 rebounds per game. In his final season (1988–89), he averaged 20.9 points per game.

In the 1986–87 season, Jebbison was named as co-MVP for the Brandon basketball team. In the 1985–86 season, Jebbison was named as Brandon's most improved player.

== International career ==
Jebbison represented Canada on their national team in the 1989 World Student Games and in the 1991 Pan American Games.

== Post-career awards / activity ==
Jebbison has been inducted into the Brandon University Sports Wall of Fame (1998), the Manitoba Basketball Hall of Fame (2005) and the Manitoba Sports Hall of Fame (2022).

Similarly, the 1987, 1988 and 1989 Brandon Basketball teams (on which Jebbison played) were admitted into the Brandon Sports Wall of Fame (2014); in the Manitoba Basketball Hall of Fame (2005); and in the Manitoba Sports Hall of Fame (2019).

Jebbison also represented the Stooges Canada Basketball Club in the 2025 FIMBA World Maxibasketball Championship in Ticino, Switzerland in the 60+ division.

== Personal life ==
Jebbison was born on March 26, 1964.
