= Rick Hansen =

Canadian athlete who traveled the globe in 1987 (born 1957)

- Rick Hansen at the Toronto International Film Festival in 2026

Personal information
- Nationality: Canadian
- Born: Richard Marvin Hansen; 26 August 1957 (age 69) Port Alberni, British Columbia, Canada
- Education: University of British Columbia
- Occupations: Disability activist, former paralympian
- Spouse: Amanda Reid (m. 1987)

Sport
- Country: Canada
- Sport: Track and Field
Medal record
Paralympic Games
Gold medal – first place	1980 Arnhem	800 m 4
Gold medal – first place	1984 Stoke Mandeville	1500 m 4
Gold medal – first place	1984 Stoke Mandeville	Marathon 4
Silver medal – second place	1980 Arnhem	1500 m 4
Silver medal – second place	1984 Stoke Mandeville	5000 m 4
Bronze medal – third place	1980 Arnhem	4×100 m relay 2–5

Richard Marvin Hansen CC OBC (born 26 August 1957) is a Canadian Paralympic track-and-field athlete, activist, and philanthropist for people with disabilities. He represented Canada at 1980 and 1984 Summer Paralympics, and is a three-time Gold medalist.

Paraplegic since the age of 15, he is also known for his Man In Motion World Tour, in which he circled the globe in a wheelchair to demonstrate the potential of people with disabilities if barriers were removed. It was also to raise money to support the removal of additional barriers for people with disabilities in the future.

Hansen was inducted into Canada's Sports Hall of Fame in 2006. He was one of the final torchbearers in the 1988 Winter Olympics and the 2010 Winter Olympics. He was profiled and spoke during the 2010 Winter Paralympics opening ceremony.

== Early life ==
Born in Port Alberni, British Columbia in 1957, Rick Hansen grew up in Williams Lake, British Columbia. He had an active childhood, where he played volleyball, baseball, softball, and basketball. He often spent time outdoors with his father and grandfather who took him fishing.

On June 27, 1973, Hansen and a friend were coming back from a fishing trip and riding in the back of a pickup truck when the driver lost control of the vehicle and rolled. The impact threw Hansen and his friend from the vehicle, resulting in a spinal injury that left Hansen paralyzed from the waist down.

He worked on rehabilitation, completed high school, and in 1976 he enrolled at the University of British Columbia, and became the first student with a physical disability to graduate with a bachelor's degree in physical education in 1986 from the university. Hansen won national championships on wheelchair volleyball and wheelchair basketball teams. In 1977, Hansen recruited Terry Fox to join the Vancouver Cable Cars to play on their wheelchair basketball team. The two became good friends.

== Competitive career ==
Hansen went on to become a world-class champion wheelchair marathoner and Paralympic athlete. He competed in wheelchair racing, winning a total of six medals: three gold, two silver, and one bronze. Hansen won 19 international wheelchair marathons, including three world championships. He also coached high school basketball and volleyball. Hansen had a very close relationship with his family, especially with his brother, father and grandfather, with whom he enjoyed frequent fishing trips.

== Man in Motion World Tour ==
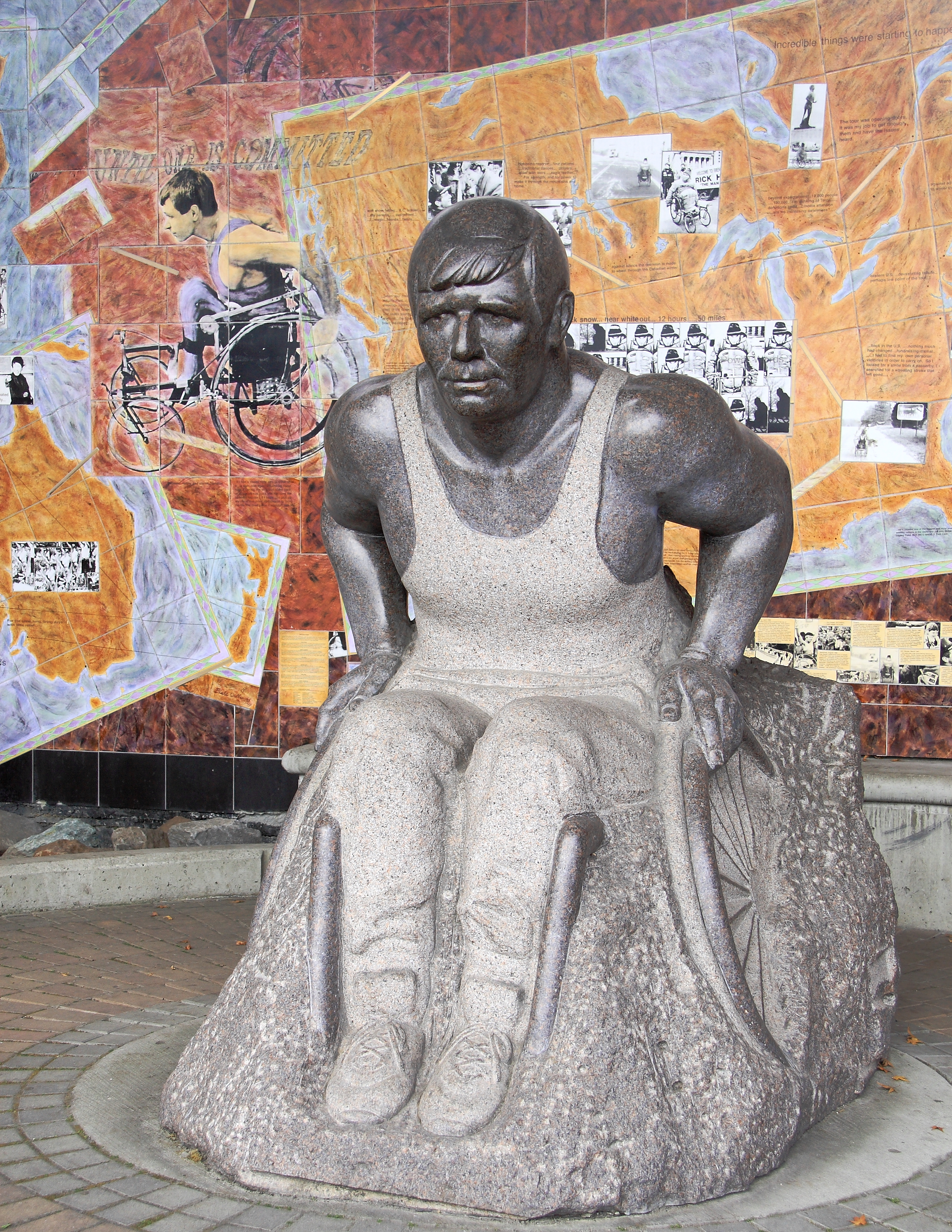
Upright Hansen's statue, in honour of his Man in Motion World Tour, at the 700 block of West 10th Avenue, on the east side of the Blusson Spinal Cord Centre in front of the Heather Annex Pavilion.

In 1980, fellow British Columbian and Canadian athlete Terry Fox, who had lost a leg to bone cancer, undertook the Marathon of Hope, intending to run across Canada from Newfoundland to Vancouver Island to raise awareness for cancer research. He made it from St. John's, Newfoundland to Thunder Bay, Ontario before a recurrence of his cancer forced him to stop, about halfway through his journey. Inspired by the way Canadians decided to reframe disability by Fox's demonstration of ability, Hansen decided he also wanted to make a difference by applying his athletic talent on his Man In Motion World Tour to demonstrate the potential of people with disabilities if barriers were removed and to inspire a more accessible world.

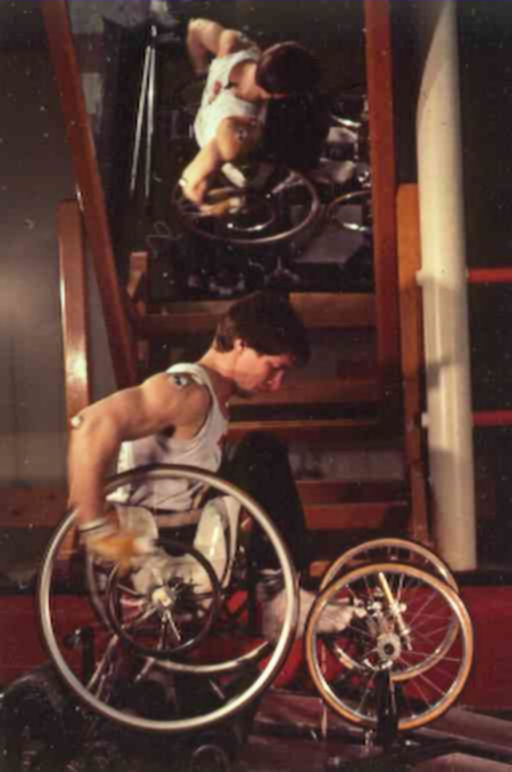
In UBC Biomechanics Lab, preparing for tour

On March 21, 1985, at Oakridge Mall in Vancouver, Hansen embarked on his Man In Motion World Tour. The Tour lasted 26 months and 40,075 km, with him averaging 12 to 14 hours of wheeling and 85 km of travel a day. He travelled through 34 countries on four continents (North America, Europe, Oceania, and Asia) before crossing Canada. One of the highlights of the Tour was wheeling up the Great Wall of China. Hansen's highest summit was in the Swiss Alps at 5,577 ft (1700 metres). Having garnered worldwide attention during the Tour, on May 22, 1987, he arrived at BC Place Stadium, being greeted by 50,000 well-wishers. Hansen and his team raised $26 million for the removal of barriers for people with disabilities. The Tour also helped to change the way people with disabilities are perceived.

On May 22, 2017, Hansen donated one of his well-used gloves from the Tour to the Canadian Museum of History. The glove is on display in the Museum's signature exhibition, the Canadian History Hall, alongside an image from Hansen's Man In Motion World Tour visit to the Great Wall of China in April 1986.

On May 17, 2020, the Canadian Museum of History announced the acquisition of the Rick Hansen Man In Motion World Tour Collection. Spanning Hansen's early athletic career and life on Tour, the collection includes 1,700 artifacts and thousands of behind-the-scenes videos, photographs and documents. The collection was donated by Rick Hansen. The Rick Hansen Gallery located in the BC Sports Hall of Fame and Museum features a small selection of memorabilia from Hansen's Tour including one of his wheelchairs, competitive wheelchair marathon medals and video footage.

The song "St. Elmo's Fire (Man in Motion)" was inspired by Rick Hansen's Man In Motion World Tour, and written by Canadian record producer and composer David Foster and British musician John Parr, and performed by Parr for the soundtrack of the film St. Elmo's Fire. It reached No. 1 on the Billboard Hot 100 in the United States in September 1985.

== Post-tour career ==
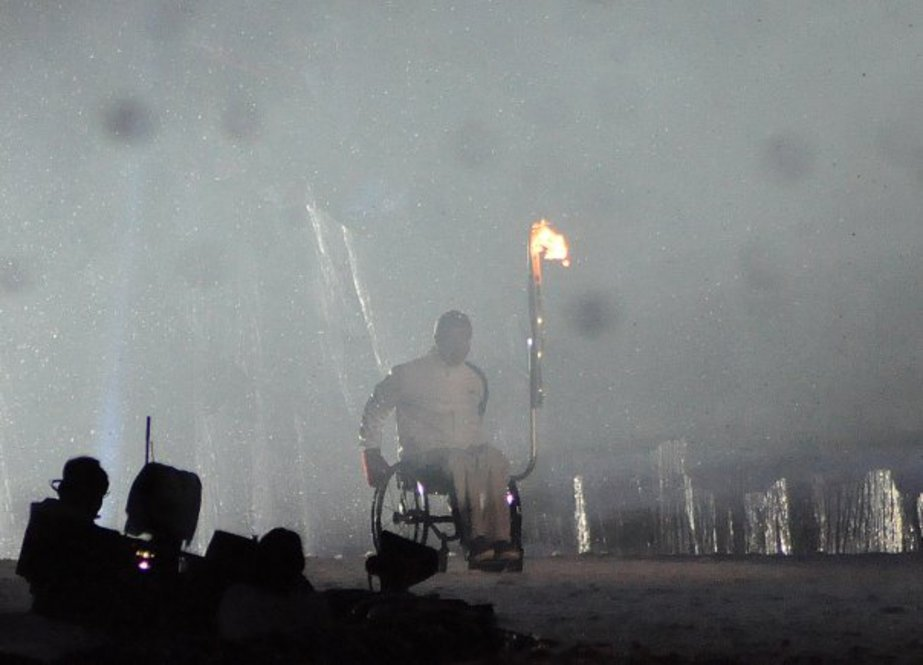
Hansen carries the Olympic flame into BC Place Stadium during the 2010 Winter Olympics opening ceremony

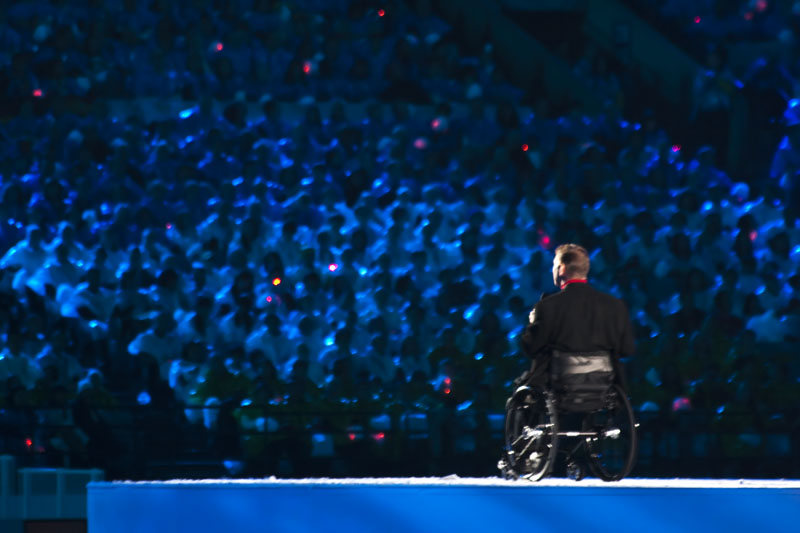
Hansen speaks to the crowd at the BC Place Stadium during the 2010 Winter Paralympics opening ceremony

Hansen is the founder of the Rick Hansen Foundation, which has generated more than $394 million to heighten awareness, change attitudes and advance the quality of life for people with disabilities.

CTV News Special: Rick Hansen: Unbreakable 50 Years Later aired on December 2, 2023 featuring interviews with Hansen and Sandie Rinaldo, along with exclusive footage of Hansen returning to the site of the accident in Williams Lake for the first time. The event marked 50 years since he sustained his spinal cord injury.

=== Rick Hansen Foundation ===
The Rick Hansen Foundation was established in 1988, as a legacy to Rick Hansen's Man In Motion World Tour to continue raising funds and awareness to create a world without barriers for people with disabilities. For over 35 years, the Foundation has been actively improving the lives of people with disabilities, changing perceptions and breaking down barriers. The vision of the organization is to create an inclusive world where people with disabilities are living to their full potential. Through programs, collaboration and leadership, the Foundation continues to remove both physical and attitudinal barriers, and improve the quality of life for people with disabilities, which include the cure and care of people living with spinal cord injuries (SCI).

The Foundation operates two major programs. The Rick Hansen Foundation School Program educates and empowers youth from Kindergarten to Grade 12 to become accessibility and inclusion champions. The Rick Hansen Foundation Accessibility Certification (RHFAC) program provides a range of accessibility training courses, and rates and certifies sites on their level of meaningful accessibility for people of varying abilities.

Every year, starting on the last Sunday in May, Canadians celebrate National AccessAbility Week (NAAW). Founded as “National Access Awareness Week" in 1988, and inspired by Hansen's Man In Motion World Tour, this week is an opportunity to celebrate Canadians with disabilities and raise awareness of the critical need for accessibility and inclusion in communities and workplaces. During 2011 and 2012, the Foundation was also part of a cross-Canada tour called the Rick Hansen 25th Anniversary Relay that followed the same route as Hansen's original Man In Motion Tour, roughly 25 years after it began.

On June 23, 2013, Vancouver Sun reporter David Baines published a detailed investigative story about the finances of Hansen and his various foundations and groups. The article, "Behind the Rick Hansen Foundation: Charity's Financial Stewardship Questioned", revealed that "in 2009, Hansen donated rights to his name [to the Rick Hansen Foundation] for $1.8 million. In return, he received a $1.8-million tax receipt." Based on financial statements from the foundation, it reported that Hansen's salary prior to resigning from his positions as president and CEO in 2011 was "more than $400,000 a year; how much more is not clear."

=== Spinal cord injury research ===
Hansen was noted as "the driving force" in the development of the 48 million dollars raised for the International Collaboration of Repair Discoveries (ICORD), an interdisciplinary research centre focused on spinal cord injury. ICORD also maintains the Rick Hansen Spinal Cord Injury Registry, allowing doctors and experts across the country to share vital information on what works and what doesn't for specific kinds of spinal cord injuries.

ICORD is located inside the Blusson Spinal Cord Centre, which is also home to the Brenda and David McLean Integrated Spine Clinic, which provides one-stop outpatient care for people with spinal cord injuries or diseases of the spine, as well as the Praxis Spinal Cord Institute (formerly the Rick Hansen Institute).

The building integrates both SCI research with care.

=== Other initiatives ===
Hansen is a supporter of the conservation of Fraser River White sturgeon and Pacific Salmon. He has served as chair for the Founding Chair of both Fraser River Sturgeon Conservation Society (FRSCS) and the Pacific Salmon Endowment Fund Society, helping to restore and protect sturgeon and salmon populations in British Columbia. Hansen contributed to the Fraser River Sturgeon Conservation Society with the money earned from the book Tale of the Great White Fish. He continues to support the FRSCS and the Pacific Salmon Foundation.

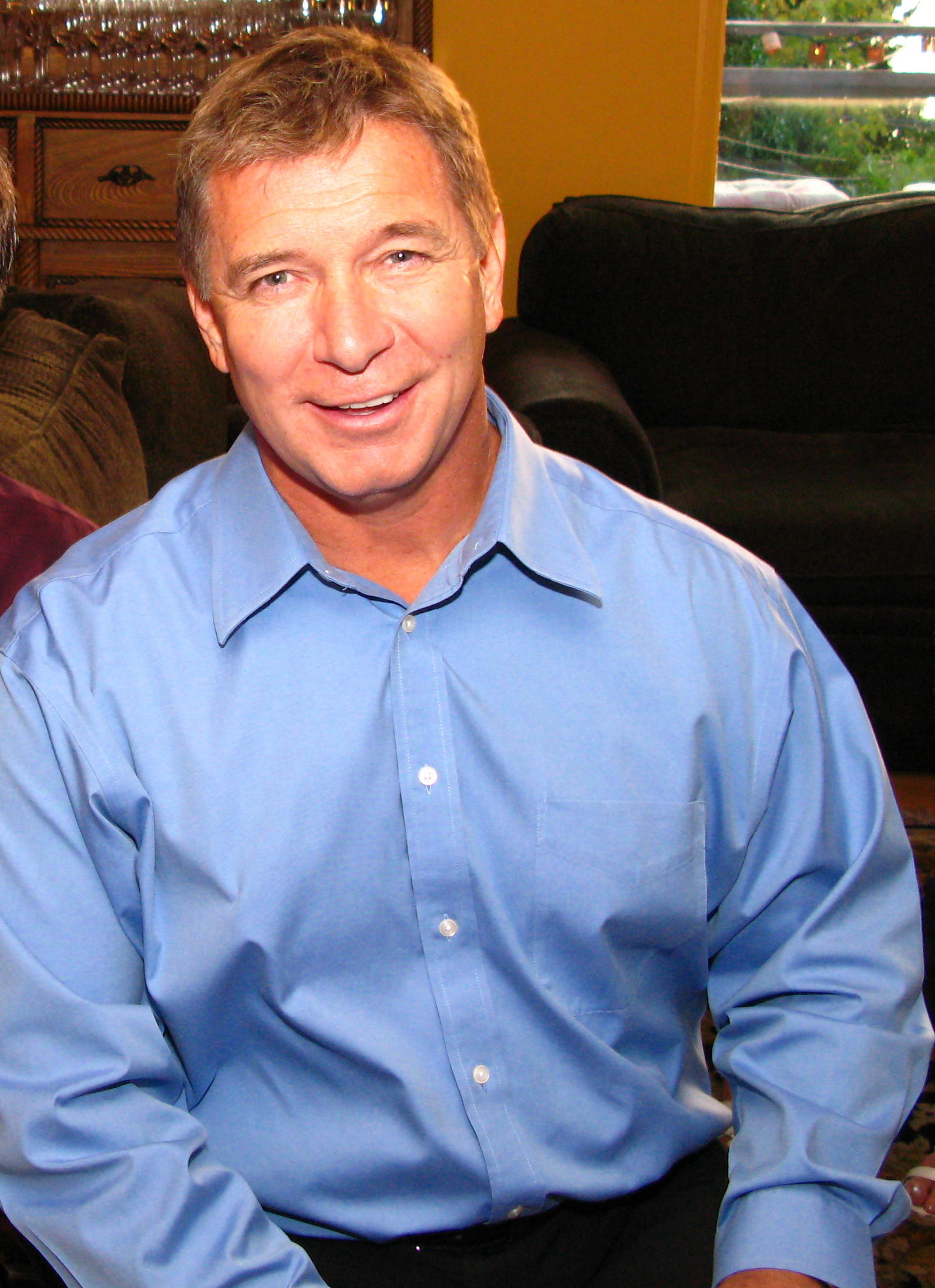
Hansen in 2008

== Professional background ==
- Founder, Rick Hansen Foundation (2018–present)
- President and CEO, Rick Hansen Foundation (1997–2018)
- Consultant on Disability Issues to the President, University of British Columbia (1989–1991)
- Commissioner General to Canada Pavilion at World Exposition '88 in Brisbane, Australia (1987–1988)

== Awards and honours ==
- Professional Sports Achievement Award, Pan Am Clinic Foundation (2018)
- Jack Diamond Sports Personality of the Year Award, Jewish Community Centre (2017)
- Senate 150th Anniversary Medal, The Senate (2017)
- Social Impact Award, Doha GOAL Foundation (2015)
- Recognition of Achievement Award, Excellence Canada (2013)
- Queen Elizabeth II Diamond Jubilee Medal (2012)[DT1]
- Recipient of CPA Alberta's Christopher Reeve Award (2007)
- Canada's Walk of Fame (2007)
- William Van Horne Visionary Award, Canada's Sports Hall of Fame (2006)
- Induction into Canada's Sports Hall of Fame (2006)
- Queen Elizabeth II Golden Jubilee Commemorative Medal, Governor General of Canada (2002)[DT2]
- Athlete of the Century, BC Wheelchair Sports (2000)
- Royal Bank Award (1994)
- University of British Columbia Athletic Hall of Fame (1994)
- Terry Fox Hall of Fame (1993)
- 125th Anniversary of the Confederation of Canada Medal, Governor General of Canada (1992)
- Order of British Columbia (1990)
- Freedom of the City Award, City of Vancouver (1987)
- W.A.C. Bennett Award, BC Sports Hall of Fame (1987)
- Newsmaker of the Year, Canadian Press (1986)
- Outstanding Young Person of the World for personal improvement and accomplishment by Junior Chamber International (1983)
- University of British Columbia's Alumni Award of Distinction (1983)
- Athlete of the Week: by ABC Wide World of Sports (1983)
- Lou Marsh Trophy, auxiliary award of special merit winner – co-winner with Wayne Gretzky(1982)
- Special Achievement Award, University of British Columbia (1979–1982)
- "Outstanding Athlete of the Year," by Canadian Wheelchair Sports Association (1980)
- Newsmaker of the Year by Canadian Press (1986)
- UBC Sports Hall of Fame
- People in Motion, a not-for-profit organization was named after Hansen
- Four public schools have been named after Hansen:
  - Rick Hansen Secondary School, Abbotsford, British Columbia
  - Rick Hansen Secondary School, Mississauga, Ontario
  - Rick Hansen Elementary School, London, Ontario
  - Rick Hansen Public School, Aurora, Ontario

=== Order of Canada ===
Hansen was appointed a Companion of the Order of Canada on June 29, 1987. His citation reads:

Already a world-renowned wheelchair athlete, this British Columbian fulfilled a dream of wheeling around the world to make others aware of the potential of the disabled and to raise funds for spinal cord research among other things. His 44,075 km. journey, recently completed, took him to four continents and 34 countries, inspiring people around the world to realize their potential and raising many millions of dollars for the cause.

== Honorary appointments ==
- Honorary Director, Ontario Neurotrauma Foundation (2002)
- Honorary Board member, Think First Foundation (1998–2000)
- Honorary Chair, Brain and Spinal Cord Research Centre Campaign, Faculty of Medicine, University of British Columbia (1995)
- Honorary Patron, B.C. Aboriginal Network on Disability Society (1995–Present)
- Honorary Chair, Grey Cup Festival (1994)
- Honorary Chair, Active Living Alliance for Canadians with a Disability (1990–Present)
- Honorary Chair, Alberta Premier's Advisory Council for Persons with Disabilities (1989–Present)
- Honorary Chair, BC Premier's Advisory Council for Persons with Disabilities (1989–Present)

Hansen was named Commissioner General for the Canadian Pavilion at Expo '88 in Brisbane, Queensland, Australia.

== Township named after Hansen ==
In 1986, a township in Sudbury District, Ontario, previously named the Geographical Township of Stalin, altered its name to the Township of Hansen in the athlete's honour. It is now within the boundary of the municipality of Killarney.

== Media ==
In 2017, Hansen collaborated with Jake MacDonald on Rick Hansen's Man In Motion World Tour, a book celebrating the 30th anniversary of the Tour. He is also the co-author of two books: the autobiographical Rick Hansen: Man in Motion, written with Jim Taylor (published in 1987, ISBN 0-88894-560-4), and the self-help book Going the Distance: 7 steps to personal change, written with Dr. Joan Laub. Hansen is also the inspiration for four children's books, Boy in Motion, Roll On, Tale of a Great White Fish: A Sturgeon Story and The Boy Who Loved to Move.

Man in Motion: The Rick Hansen Story, a documentary film about Hansen by Adrian Buitenhuis, premiered at the 2026 Toronto International Film Festival.

== Personal life ==
Hansen and his wife Amanda Reid first met during his Man in Motion World Tour as she was his physiotherapist. They married in 1987 and have three daughters and grandchildren.

== Honours ==
=== Commonwealth honours ===
Location	Date	Appointment	Post-nominal letters
Canada	June 29, 1987 – Present	Companion of the Order of Canada	CC
British Columbia	1990 – Present	Member of the Order of British Columbia	OBC
Canada	1992	125th Anniversary of the Confederation of Canada Medal	
Canada	2002	Queen Elizabeth II Golden Jubilee Medal (Canadian Version)	
Canada	2012	Queen Elizabeth II Diamond Jubilee Medal (Canadian Version)	

=== Scholastic ===
Chancellor, visitor, governor, rector and fellowships

Location	Date	School	Position
British Columbia	March 3, 2021 – Present	Douglas College	Honorary Fellow

Honorary Degrees

Location	Date	School	Degree	Gave Commencement Address
British Columbia	September 1987	University of British Columbia	Doctor of Laws (LL.D)	Yes
Nova Scotia	May 12, 1993	Saint Mary's University	Doctor of Civil Law (DCL)	Yes
British Columbia	August 1994	University of Victoria	Doctor of Laws (LL.D)	Yes
Ontario	June 1995	University of Toronto	Doctor of Laws (LL.D)	Yes
Saskatchewan	Fall 1997	University of Regina	Doctor of Laws (LL.D)	Yes
Ontario	October 24, 1997	University of Western Ontario	Doctor of Laws (LL.D)	Yes
Ontario	1999	McMaster University	Doctor of Laws (LL.D)	Yes
British Columbia	2004	British Columbia Institute of Technology	Doctor of Technology (D.Tech.)	Yes
Quebec	May 30, 2005	McGill University	Doctor of Letters (D.Litt.)	Yes
British Columbia	2005	Kwantlen Polytechnic University	Doctor of Laws (LL.D)	Yes
British Columbia	2007	Thompson Rivers University	Doctor of Letters (D.Litt.)	Yes
British Columbia	2008	University of Northern British Columbia	Doctor of Laws (LL.D)	Yes
British Columbia	June 6, 2008	Simon Fraser University	Doctor of Laws (LL.D)	Yes
Ontario	2009	Carleton University	Doctor of Laws (LL.D)	Yes
British Columbia	May 12, 2009	Vancouver Island University	Doctor of Laws (LL.D)	Yes
Alberta	Fall 2011	University of Alberta	Doctor of Laws (LL.D)	Yes
Quebec	2011	Université Laval	Doctorate	Yes
Israel	June 10, 2012	Hebrew University of Jerusalem	Doctorate	Yes
Ontario	Spring 2013	York University	Doctor of Laws (LL.D)	Yes
Alberta	May 31, 2018	University of Lethbridge	Doctor of Laws (LL.D)	Yes
Nova Scotia	October 25, 2018	Dalhousie University	Doctor of Laws (LL.D)	Yes
Nova Scotia	May 12, 2019	Acadia University	Doctor of Humanities (DH)	Yes
Alberta	June 7, 2019	Athabasca University	Doctor of Laws (LL.D)	Yes
Nova Scotia	2019	Mount Saint Vincent University	Doctor of Humane Letters (DHL)	Yes

== Honorary military appointments ==
Military Branch	Date	Regiment	Position
(Canada) Canadian Army	May 22, 2012 – 2015	Canadian Forces Joint Personnel Support Unit	Honorary Colonel
