= Lockerby Composite School =

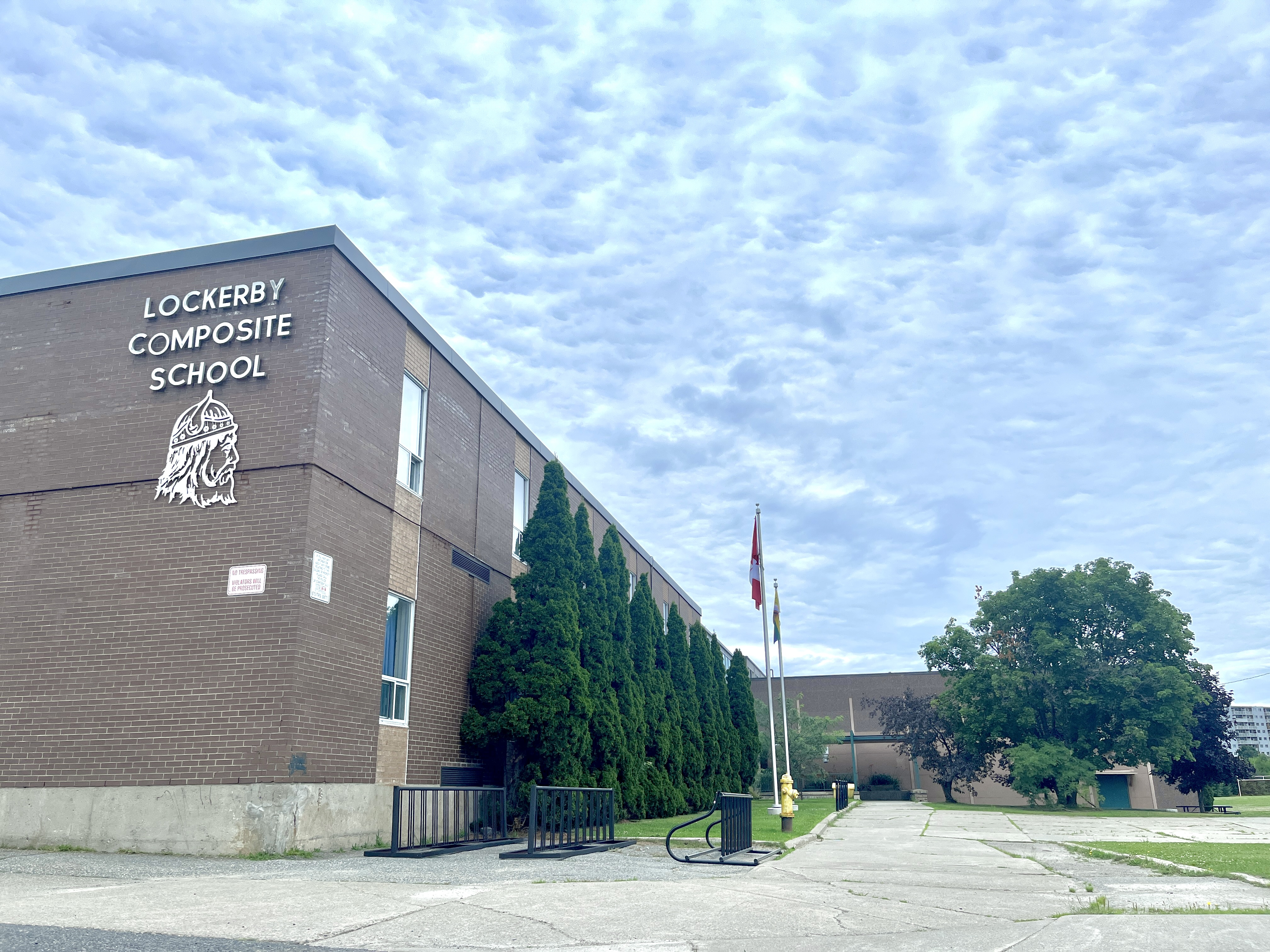

Location
- 1391 Ramsey View Court; Sudbury, Ontario, P3E 5T4; Canada; 46.4654°N 81.0056°W

Information
- School type: Secondary
- Founded: 1958
- School board: Rainbow District School Board
- Principal: Ryan Lafraniere
- Grades: 9-12
- Enrollment: 516 (2023–2024)
- Language: English, French Immersion
- Colours: Green, white and gold
- Team name: Vikings
- Website: lockerby.rainbowschools.ca

Lockerby Composite School is a public high school located in the Lockerby neighbourhood of Greater Sudbury, Ontario. Opened in 1958, Lockerby Composite School has 516 students as of 2024, from grades 9 to 12, and is part of the Rainbow District School Board.

== History ==
Lockerby Composite School was opened in 1958 as a part of the Nickel District Collegiate Institute Board.

In 1995 after Lockerby student Laura Cotesta was diagnosed with cancer, the school created the annual Kids Caring for Kids Cancer Drive which involved students going door-to-door collecting money near the school to fundraise for the Northern Cancer Foundation. In 2023, the total amount of money raised reached $1 million.

== Academics ==
=== Science Technology Education Program (STEP) ===
Lockerby's Science Technology Education Program (STEP) was founded in 1991, with the intention of helping students who are more inclined to enter science and technology pathways. STEP students entering grades 9 and 10 study science, technological design, mathematics, and social science courses for the entire school year, leaving time for participation in STEP integration days each week with experts in STEP-related academic fields compared to the regular four-class semesters for regular students. In grades 11 and 12, STEP students choose to study a science and technology specialization based on their courses of interest, with their schedule returning to the regular 4 courses per semester with no STEP Integrations Days.

== Extracurricular activities ==
=== Athletics ===
Lockerby fields 26 athletics varsity teams for the Sudbury District Secondary Schools' Athletic Association (SDSSAA) and Northern Ontario Secondary Schools Athletics (NOSSA). The teams include golf, flag football, basketball, volleyball, cross-country running, alpine skiing, snowboarding, track, swimming, curling, and hockey teams, among others. Lockerby has won multiple Ontario Federation of School Athletic Associations (OFSAA) competition titles, the most recent being boys' curling in 2007.

=== Clubs ===
Lockerby has 19 clubs, committees, and councils.

==== Mock trial ====
Lockerby competes in the Hennessy Cup, the Northern Ontario mock trial competition which includes schools from the Rainbow District School Board and the Near North District School Board. The school has most recently won the cup in the 2023–24 school year, beating out Espanola High School.

== Controversy ==
In November 2016, Lockerby technology teacher Alain Bergeron resigned after sex charges were brought against him relating to inappropriate sexual comments and actions between January 2014 and October 2015. He was originally expected to go on trial in January 2017, but resigned his teaching license in Ontario and took a one-year $500 peace bond, which included the condition of staying away from nine students at the school.

== Notable alumni ==
- Lance Cryderman - Paralympic boccia player
- Tracy Fleury - National curler
- Devon Kershaw - Olympic cross-country skier
- Eli Pasquale - Olympic basketball player
- David Turcotte - Olympic basketball player
- Kevin Turcotte - Trumpet player
- Jamie West - Ontario provincial politician

== See also ==
- Education in Ontario
- List of secondary schools in Ontario
