= 1983 FIBA Under-19 World Championship =

1983 FIBA Under-19 Basketball World Cup
Tournament details
- Host country: Spain
- Dates: 14–28 August
- Teams: 14 (from 5 federations)
- Venue: 1 (in 1 host city)

Final positions
- Champions: United States (2nd title)

Tournament statistics
- Top scorer: (Uruguay) Luis Pierri (33.0)
- PPG (Team): Soviet Union (92.6)

Official website
- 1983 FIBA U19 World Championship

The 1983 FIBA Under-19 World Championship (Spanish: 1983 Campeonato Mundial FIBA Sub-19) was the 2nd edition of the FIBA U19 World Championship. It was held in Palma de Mallorca, Spain from 14 to 28 August 1983.

The United States successfully defended their championship by winning the Gold Medal against the Soviet Union in the final day of the tournament, 82-78.

== Qualification ==
Defending World Champions
Host country, advances outright to the semifinal round

FIBA Americas (6)	FIBA Europe (5)	FIBA Asia (1)	FIBA Africa (1)	FIBA Oceania (1)
United States	Spain	China	Angola	Australia
Brazil	Yugoslavia			
Argentina	Soviet Union			
Canada	Italy			
Uruguay	West Germany			
Dominican Republic				

== Preliminary round ==
=== Group A ===
Team	Pld	W	L	PF	PA	PD	Pts	Head-to-Head
Brazil	3	2	1	227	203	+24	5	1−0
West Germany	3	2	1	226	188	+38	5	0−1
Australia	3	1	2	209	226	–17	4	1−0
China	3	1	2	227	272	–45	4	0−1

14 August 1983
19:00

Boxscore

Australia	59–69	West Germany
Scoring by half: 31–41, 28–28
Pts: Johnson 14		Pts: Schrempf, Behnke 20

Palma de Mallorca

14 August 1983
20:45

Boxscore

Brazil	82–86	China
Scoring by half: 40–40, 42–46
Pts: Villas Boas 25		Pts: Wang F. 24

Palma de Mallorca

15 August 1983
19:00

Boxscore

West Germany	55–63	Brazil
Scoring by half: 32–34, 23–29
Pts: Schrempf 20		Pts: Zanon, Cintas 17

Palma de Mallorca

15 August 1983
20:45

Boxscore

Australia	88–75	China
Scoring by half: 36–37, 52–38
Pts: Johnson 24		Pts: Zhang 20

Palma de Mallorca

16 August 1983
19:00

Boxscore

China	66–102	West Germany
Scoring by half: 34–53, 32–49
Pts: Wang F. 20		Pts: Schrempf 23

Palma de Mallorca

16 August 1983
20:45

Boxscore

Australia	62–82	Brazil
Scoring by half: 41–48, 21–34
Pts: Wain 23		Pts: Villas Boas 22

Palma de Mallorca

=== Group B ===
Team	Pld	W	L	PF	PA	PD	Pts
Yugoslavia	3	3	0	292	269	+23	6
Argentina	3	2	1	315	290	+25	5
Canada	3	1	2	246	258	–12	4
Dominican Republic	3	0	3	245	281	–36	3

14 August 1983
19:30

Boxscore

Yugoslavia	98–89	Dominican Republic
Scoring by half: 50–35, 48–54
Pts: Bukumirović 31		Pts: Esteban 30

Palma de Mallorca

14 August 1983
21:30

Boxscore

Canada	94–104	Argentina
Scoring by half: 47–49, 47–55
Pts: Turcotte 21		Pts: Campana 48

Palma de Mallorca

15 August 1983
19:30

Boxscore

Canada	67–62	Dominican Republic
Scoring by half: 28–33, 39–29
Pts: Tokarchuk 14		Pts: Vargas 17

Palma de Mallorca

15 August 1983
21:30

Boxscore

Argentina	95–102	Yugoslavia
Scoring by half: 43–54, 52–48
Pts: Campana 27		Pts: Cvjetićanin 35

Palma de Mallorca

16 August 1983
19:30

Boxscore

Dominican Republic	94–116	Argentina
Scoring by half: 45–55, 49–61
Pts: Esteban 27		Pts: Campana 52

Palma de Mallorca

16 August 1983
19:30

Boxscore

Canada	85–92	Yugoslavia
Scoring by half: 40–56, 45–36
Pts: Turcotte 24		Pts: Cvjetićanin 30

Palma de Mallorca

=== Group C ===
Team	Pld	W	L	PF	PA	PD	Pts
Soviet Union	3	3	0	305	202	+103	6
Italy	3	2	1	247	228	+19	5
Uruguay	3	1	2	227	253	–26	4
Angola	3	0	3	179	517	–73	3

14 August 1983
19:00

Boxscore

Angola	53–114	Soviet Union
Scoring by half: 31–55, 22–59
Pts: Guimarães 21		Pts: Sabonis 22

Palma de Mallorca

14 August 1983
20:45

Boxscore

Italy	85–79	Uruguay
Scoring by half: 43–37, 42–42
Pts: Binelli 16		Pts: Pierri 33

Palma de Mallorca

15 August 1983
19:00

Boxscore

Angola	72–77	Uruguay
Scoring by half: 34–33, 38–44
Pts: Guimarães 34		Pts: Pierri 37

Palma de Mallorca

15 August 1983
20:45

Boxscore

Soviet Union	95–78	Italy
Scoring by half: 43–54, 52–48
Pts: Sabonis 27		Pts: Montecchi 18

Palma de Mallorca

16 August 1983
19:00

Boxscore

Angola	54–84	Italy
Scoring by half: 30–43, 24–41
Pts: Conceição 15		Pts: Montecchi 18

Palma de Mallorca

16 August 1983
20:45

Boxscore

Uruguay	71–96	Soviet Union
Scoring by half: 27–43, 44–53
Pts: Pierri 35		Pts: Kornichin 25

Palma de Mallorca

== Final round ==
=== Classification 9th-14th ===
Team	Pld	W	L	PF	PA	PD	Pts
Dominican Republic	4	4	0	337	297	+40	8
Australia	4	3	1	355	306	+49	7
China	4	3	1	382	330	+52	7
Uruguay	4	1	3	349	368	–19	5
Angola	4	1	3	292	318	–26	5
Canada	4	0	4	295	391	–96	4

18 August 1983
18:00

Boxscore

Australia	99–72	Angola
Scoring by half: 48–36, 51–36
Pts: Dalton 19		Pts: Guimarães 28

Llucmajor

18 August 1983
19:45

Boxscore

Dominican Republic	91–89	China
Scoring by half: 43–37, 42–42
Pts: Esteban 22		Pts: Zhang 28

Palma de Mallorca

18 August 1983
21:30

Boxscore

Canada	92–100	Uruguay
Scoring by half: 43–56, 49–44
Pts: Turcotte 25		Pts: Pierri 39

Palma de Mallorca

19 August 1983
18:00

Boxscore

Australia	72–82	Dominican Republic
Scoring by half: 45–42, 27–40
Pts: Dalton 20		Pts: Esteban 26

Palma de Mallorca

19 August 1983
19:45

Boxscore

Canada	61–84	Angola
Scoring by half: 36–41, 25–43
Pts: Ogams 11		Pts: Guimarães 28

Palma de Mallorca

19 August 1983
21:30

Boxscore

Uruguay	87–91	China
Scoring by half: 40–48, 47–43
Pts: Pierri 38		Pts: Zhang 31

Palma de Mallorca

20 August 1983
18:45

Boxscore

Australia	98–68	Canada
Scoring by half: 57–33, 41–35
Pts: Dalton 31		Pts: Kipfer 12

Palma de Mallorca

20 August 1983
19:45

Boxscore

Uruguay	78–99	Dominican Republic
Scoring by half: 28–46, 50–53
Pts: Pierri 20		Pts: Harford 23

Palma de Mallorca

20 August 1983
21:30

Boxscore

China	93–78	Angola
Scoring by half: 51–36, 42–42
Pts: Zhang 28		Pts: Guimarães 37

Palma de Mallorca

21 August 1983
18:00

Boxscore

Australia	86–84	Uruguay
Scoring by half: 57–49, 29–35
Pts: Cottrel 27		Pts: Pierri 29

Palma de Mallorca

21 August 1983
19:45

Boxscore

Angola	58–65	Dominican Republic
Scoring by half: 33–37, 25–28
Pts: Guimarães 31		Pts: Harford 19

Palma de Mallorca

21 August 1983
21:30

Boxscore

Canada	74–109	China
Scoring by half: 35–53, 39–56
Pts: Ohl 22		Pts: Min 28

Palma de Mallorca

=== Semifinal round ===
Qualified for the gold medal game
Qualified for the bronze medal game

Team	Pld	W	L	PF	PA	PD	Pts	Head-to-Head
United States	7	5	2	630	557	+73	12	
Soviet Union	6	5	1	543	469	+74	11	
Spain	7	4	3	630	601	+29	11	
Brazil	6	3	3	528	527	+1	9	2−0
West Germany	6	3	3	453	474	–21	9	1−1
Italy	6	3	3	466	488	–22	9	0−2
Argentina	6	2	4	513	575	–62	8	
Yugoslavia	6	0	6	408	480	–72	6	

18 August 1983
19:30

Boxscore

Spain	89–71	West Germany
Scoring by half: 39–31, 50–40
Pts: Villacampa 27		Pts: Schrempf 22

Palma de Mallorca

18 August 1983
21:30

Boxscore

United States	88–75	Italy
Scoring by half: 42–38, 46–37
Pts: Krystkowiak 20		Pts: Montecchi 15

Palma de Mallorca

19 August 1983
17:30

Boxscore

Yugoslavia	77–85	Italy
Scoring by half: 33–46, 44–39
Pts: Jovanović 20		Pts: Bosa 24

Palma de Mallorca

19 August 1983
19:30

Boxscore

Brazil	114–94	Argentina
Scoring by half: 66–37, 48–57
Pts: Villas Boas 39		Pts: Belli 24

Palma de Mallorca

19 August 1983
21:15

Boxscore

Soviet Union	91–74	West Germany
Scoring by half: 48–43, 43–31
Pts: Sabonis 19		Pts: Schrempf 18

Palma de Mallorca

20 August 1983
17:30

Boxscore

Soviet Union	77–52	Yugoslavia
Scoring by half: 29–25, 48–27
Pts: Sabonis 11		Pts: Sobin 12

Palma de Mallorca

20 August 1983
19:30

Boxscore

Spain	80–84	Italy
Scoring by half: 37–43, 43–41
Pts: Villacampa 23		Pts: Ragazzi 22

Palma de Mallorca

20 August 1983
21:15

Boxscore

United States	100–84	Brazil
Scoring by half: 49–32, 51–52
Pts: Johnson, Walker 18		Pts: Villas Boas 26

Palma de Mallorca

21 August 1983
17:30

Boxscore

Yugoslavia	65–69	West Germany
Scoring by half: 37–41, 28–28
Pts: Cvjetićanin 23		Pts: Schrempf 18

Palma de Mallorca

21 August 1983
19:30

Boxscore

Spain	115–86	Argentina
Scoring by half: 58–40, 57–46
Pts: Villacampa 30		Pts: Montenegro 22

Palma de Mallorca

21 August 1983
21:15

Boxscore

United States	83–87 (OT)	Soviet Union
Scoring by half: 44–35, 33–42 Overtime: 6–10
Pts: Johnson 18		Pts: Zarkov 25

Palma de Mallorca

22 August 1983
19:30

Boxscore

Spain	98–92	Brazil
Scoring by half: 49–49, 49–43
Pts: Villacampa 42		Pts: Villas Boas 28

Palma de Mallorca

22 August 1983
21:15

Boxscore

United States	92–74	Argentina
Scoring by half: 45–45, 47–29
Pts: Walker 27		Pts: Uranga 31

Palma de Mallorca

23 August 1983
19:30

Boxscore

Italy	63–75	West Germany
Scoring by half: 22–37, 41–38
Pts: Nobile 17		Pts: Behnke 25

Palma de Mallorca

23 August 1983
19:30

Boxscore

Brazil	80–67	Yugoslavia
Scoring by half: 38–36, 42–31
Pts: Boas 25		Pts: Jovanović 25

Palma de Mallorca

23 August 1983
21:15

Boxscore

Soviet Union	87–91	Argentina
Scoring by half: 48–44, 39–47
Pts: Tikhonenko 21		Pts: Uranga 39

Palma de Mallorca

24 August 1983
17:13

Boxscore

Brazil	79–68	Italy
Scoring by half: 41–33, 38–35
Pts: Boas 28		Pts: Morandotti 16

Palma de Mallorca

24 August 1983
19:30

Boxscore

Spain	90–101	Soviet Union
Scoring by half: 44–54, 46–47
Pts: Llorente 25		Pts: Sabonis 25

Palma de Mallorca

24 August 1983
21:15

Boxscore

United States	81–79	Yugoslavia
Scoring by half: 45–42, 36–37
Pts: Johnson 27		Pts: Cvjetićanin 19

Palma de Mallorca

25 August 1983
19:30

Boxscore

Italy	91–89 (OT)	Argentina
Scoring by half: 46–46, 32–32 Overtime: 13–11
Pts: Paci 22		Pts: Uranga 31

Palma de Mallorca

25 August 1983
19:30

Boxscore

Spain	88–68	Yugoslavia
Scoring by half: 42–38, 46–30
Pts: Villacampa 33		Pts: Petović 14

Palma de Mallorca

25 August 1983
21:15

Boxscore

United States	87–88 (OT)	West Germany
Scoring by half: 41–38, 31–34 Overtime: 15–16
Pts: Johnson 23		Pts: Behnke 29

Palma de Mallorca

26 August 1983
17:30

Boxscore

West Germany	76–79	Argentina
Scoring by half: 42–39, 34–40
Pts: Schrempf 23		Pts: Uranga 24

Palma de Mallorca

26 August 1983
19:30

Boxscore

Spain	70–99	United States
Scoring by half: 37–44, 33–55
Pts: Villacampa 19		Pts: Walker 33

Palma de Mallorca

26 August 1983
21:15

Boxscore

Brazil	79–100	Soviet Union
Scoring by half: 43–55, 36–45
Pts: Villas Boas 40		Pts: Kornichin 24

Palma de Mallorca

=== Bronze medal match ===
27 August 1983
19:30

Boxscore

Brazil	71–66	Spain
Scoring by half: 42–37, 29–29
Pts: Boas 19		Pts: Llorente 25

Palma de Mallorca

=== Final ===
28 August 1983
17:30

Boxscore

Soviet Union	78–82	United States
Scoring by half: 51–48, 27–34
Pts: Sabonis 29		Pts: Walker 22

Palma de Mallorca

== Final standings ==
Rank	Team	Record
1st place, gold medalist(s)	United States	6–2
2nd place, silver medalist(s)	Soviet Union	8–2
3rd place, bronze medalist(s)	Brazil	6–4
4th	Spain	4–4
5th	West Germany	5–4
6th	Italy	5–4
7th	Argentina	4–5
8th	Yugoslavia	3–6
9th	Dominican Republic	4–3
10th	Australia	4–3
11th	China	4–3
12th	Uruguay	2–5
13th	Angola	1–6
14th	Canada	1–6

== Awards ==
1983 Under-19 World champions

United States
Second title
