= Rick Hansen Secondary School (Mississauga) =

Location
- 1150 Dream Crest Road; Mississauga, Ontario, L5V 1N6; Canada; 43.5886°N 79.6835°W

Information
- School type: Public, High school
- Motto: "Be The Best You Can Be" "The End Is Just The Beginning": Rick Hansen; STORM: (STEWARDSHIP; TECHNOLOGY; OPPORTUNITY; RESPONSIVENESS; METACURRICULUM)
- Founded: 1999; 27 years ago
- School board: Peel District School Board
- Superintendent: Gale Solomon-Henry
- Area trustee: Sue Lawton; Robert Crocker; Sue Benjamin
- Principal: Heike Bronson
- Staff: 163
- Grades: 9-12
- Enrolment: 1673 (September 2009)
- Language: English
- Colours: Maroon, Black, Gold, and Gray
- Mascot: Stormy/ Thunder
- Team name: Storm
- Yearbook: School In Motion
- Website: rickhansen.peelschools.org

Rick Hansen Secondary School (RHSS), opened in 1999, is a public high school located in Mississauga, Ontario.

Rick Hansen Secondary School is home to graduates from Fallingbrook Middle School, Fairwind Senior Public School, and Hazel McCallion Senior Public School.

In 2002, the school underwent expansion, during which a new wing on the west side of the school was built. This wing added 14 classrooms, 2 dance studios, and 2 art rooms, accommodating the 2,000 students attending RHSS.

Rick Hansen Secondary School is a sister school to Rick Hansen Secondary School in Abbotsford, British Columbia with which it shares a school mascot named Stormy.

== History ==
When the school opened on September 7, 1999, it was named East Credit Secondary School, and it was one of the first schools where the administrative staff helped create the blueprint of the school. It was the first public high school to open in Peel in ten years. Many Canadian icons were considered for the school's name, but the Peel District School Board ultimately chose Rick Hansen Secondary School. Rick Hansen granted permission to the Peel District School Board to use his name for the school, saying that he was "delighted that your school will be part of my heritage and to carry the history of the Man in Motion tour by being a barrier-free school." The school's architects implemented a wheelchair-friendly and barrier-free design by doing the following:

- All floor tiles featured a special color scheme to assist students with visual impairments
- Disabled parking spots were relocated into a more accessible location
- All furniture in every classroom was barrier-free
- There was a specialized door system that made hallways fully accessible to students
- Handles on all doors in the school were lowered for accessibility
- Push buttons were installed in every drinking fountain
- The library shelves were spaced enough for a wheelchair to go through
- Disabled showers were realigned to better suit the use of students

In the first school year, there were 655 students and 53 staff members in the school. At the time, the school only taught ninth and tenth graders. The first two floors of the school were occupied by the ninth and tenth graders and the third floor was used by elementary school students, as the neighboring Swinbourne Public School was still under construction at the time.

In 2002, the school initiated the Rammed Earth project, which began as a vision of the school's arts department. The idea was to create three rammed earth sculptures in front of the school to bring art, culture, and community together. Students have worked together to blend 15 cubic yards of clay soil with cement, sand, and pigment. The students also hand tamped over a hundred layers of soil. They put a personal artifacts into the sculptures. This project was supported by the Ontario Arts Council, Toemar Garden Centre, Rona, and ABCO Construction Inc. The sculptures were removed after the 2011–2012 school year began.

== Donations ==
Every year, students from Rick Hansen Secondary find new ways of collecting money for the Rick Hansen Foundation. The school collects a small amount of money from late students entering the school after the morning announcements have been completed. The school also has "Mad Minutes," where Peer Mentors run to every homeroom and collect as much loose change as possible from people's pockets in a short amount of time. The school also occasionally hosts many other activities, such as a coin drive, a school walk, pledge sheets, and a wheelchair basketball game at the school's gym.

== Use of technology ==
Rick Hansen was built with televisions in every room in the school until the 2016–2017 school year, when all the classroom televisions were removed. The school possesses more than twelve computer labs. The school also has its own BBS television channel powered by Digmark, an electronic signage provider. This BBS system allows announcements to be broadcast throughout the school in a PowerPoint presentation format to the school's televisions, with extras such as small breaking news updates, weather, and stock prices. There were also live morning broadcasts a couple times a month run by the broadcasting class. These broadcasts delivered morning announcements in a video format, and also showed the culture around the school by filming segments featuring students and staff but with the removal of the classroom televisions, the school has resorted to oral announcements. There is Wi-Fi throughout the school building.

=== FIRST Robotics Team ===
Rick Hansen's two FIRST Robotics Competition teams, known as THEORY6 and The Big Bang, have taken part in regional and worldwide competitions. THEORY6 started in 2003. They have won numerous awards, such as the Regional Chairman's Award in 2005 and 2012, and the Regional Engineering Inspiration Award in 2013. At the 2013 FIRST Championship, they earned the title of world champions along with two other teams: Team 610 (Crescent School) and Team 1477 (Texas Torque).

== Association with Rick Hansen ==
The school is named after Rick Hansen, an athlete who won all-star awards in five sports when he was paralyzed at the age of 15 after being thrown from the back of a truck. He subsequently became an athlete and an activist for people with spinal cord injuries. Rick Hansen has made many special visits to the school, and his most recent visit was on April 5, 2011, to celebrate the 25th anniversary of the Man in Motion World Tour. In the event, Hansen announced that a relay will take place to retrace the Canadian segment of the original Man in Motion Tour. The celebration was attended by many notable people, such as Hazel McCallion, the mayor of Mississauga, and David Onley, the Lieutenant Governor of Ontario. In total, 25 medal-bearers, including the school principal and a staff member, were chosen from the school. The Relay made its way through Rick Hansen on November 10, 2011.

== See also ==
- Education in Ontario
- List of secondary schools in Ontario
