= Etoile Sportive Prisse Macon =

- Leagues: NM2
- Founded: 1949
- Location: Prissé, France
- Website: espmbasket.com

Etoile Sportive Prisse Macon is a French professional basketball team located in Prissé, France. The team currently competes in the NM2.

Some of the club’s players have represented their African national teams at the FIBA Africa Championship, making it quite well known worldwide.

== Notable players ==
To appear in this section a player must have either:

- Set a club record or won an individual award as a professional player.
- Played at least one official international match for his senior national team or one NBA game at any time.
- (Burkina Faso) Joris Bado
- (Morocco) Nabil Bakkas
