= Vernon Secondary School =

Vernon Secondary

Location
- 2100 15th Street; Vernon, British Columbia, V1T 3Z9; Canada; 50.25759°N 119.2525°W

Information
- School type: Public, high school
- Motto: "Pride on the Hill"
- Established: 1968
- School board: School District 22 Vernon
- Superintendent: Karla Mitchell
- School number: 2222017
- Principal: Mike Edgar
- Staff: 80
- Grades: 8-12
- Enrollment: 1104 (2025/2026)
- Language: English
- Area: East Hill
- Colours: Navy, Red and White
- Mascot: Panther
- Team name: Vernon Panthers
- Website: Vernon Secondary
- Last updated: October 3, 2026

Vernon Secondary is a public high school in Vernon, British Columbia, Canada. It is part of School District 22 Vernon.

== Symbols ==
A panther is the school mascot (closely resembling the Florida Panthers of the NHL) and the institution's recreational teams are thus named accordingly.

The school's adopted colours are Navy Blue and Red, primarily, with the secondary colour being White. The school's motto is "Pride on the Hill", referring to the hill the school is situated on.

== History ==
VSS was formerly Vernon Senior Secondary School and hosted only grades 11–12, but was later changed to include grades 8-12 thus becoming Vernon Secondary School.

The school was originally built in 1967, the new school was rebuilt and opened on January 7, 2013. The $38 million state-of-the-art school is situated on the lower field of the old school's property. The school is a carbon neutral building with a natural light design, water flow reductions, a ground source heat exchanger and geothermal field.

During earlier decades of Vernon Senior Secondary School's history (including through at least the earlier 1980s), the school included students in grades 11 and 12 only. Through those decades, all the grade 11 and 12 public school students who resided in the greater Vernon area (including the Coldstream area, but excluding the school district's Lumby, Lavington, and Cherryville areas) attended this school. During those decades, the greater Vernon area's public junior high schools all served grades 8, 9, and 10 students. The area's elementary schools served grades 1 through 7 students and eventually provided kindergarten.

== Programs ==
VSS is the host school of the outdoor school program EarthQuest. Since 1982 Grade 11 students from all high schools of SD22 have had the opportunity to enroll in EarthQuest. Primarily based in nearby Kalamalka Provincial Park, students also attend VSS during the winter months.

VSS and its cafeteria program has partnered with Camosun College to offer students Professional Cook Training Level 1 through the ACE-IT Apprenticeship program (Accelerated Credit Enrolment in Industry Training) program.

== Academic terms and block scheduling ==
Vernon Secondary runs on a two semester arrangement (with a 16-day break including New Year and Christmas), the first semester starting from September to January and the second running from February until June..

During the 2020 COVID-19 pandemic, the school switched to a two quarter system with two classes for each quarter, as opposed to the normal four classes per semester. During this time, grade ten to twelve students have half the normal number of students in each afternoon class and learn from home every other afternoon.

== Notable alumni ==
- Ben Hladik, Canadian football player
- Daniel Powter, Singer (graduated in 1989)
