= Rick Hansen Secondary School (Abbotsford) =

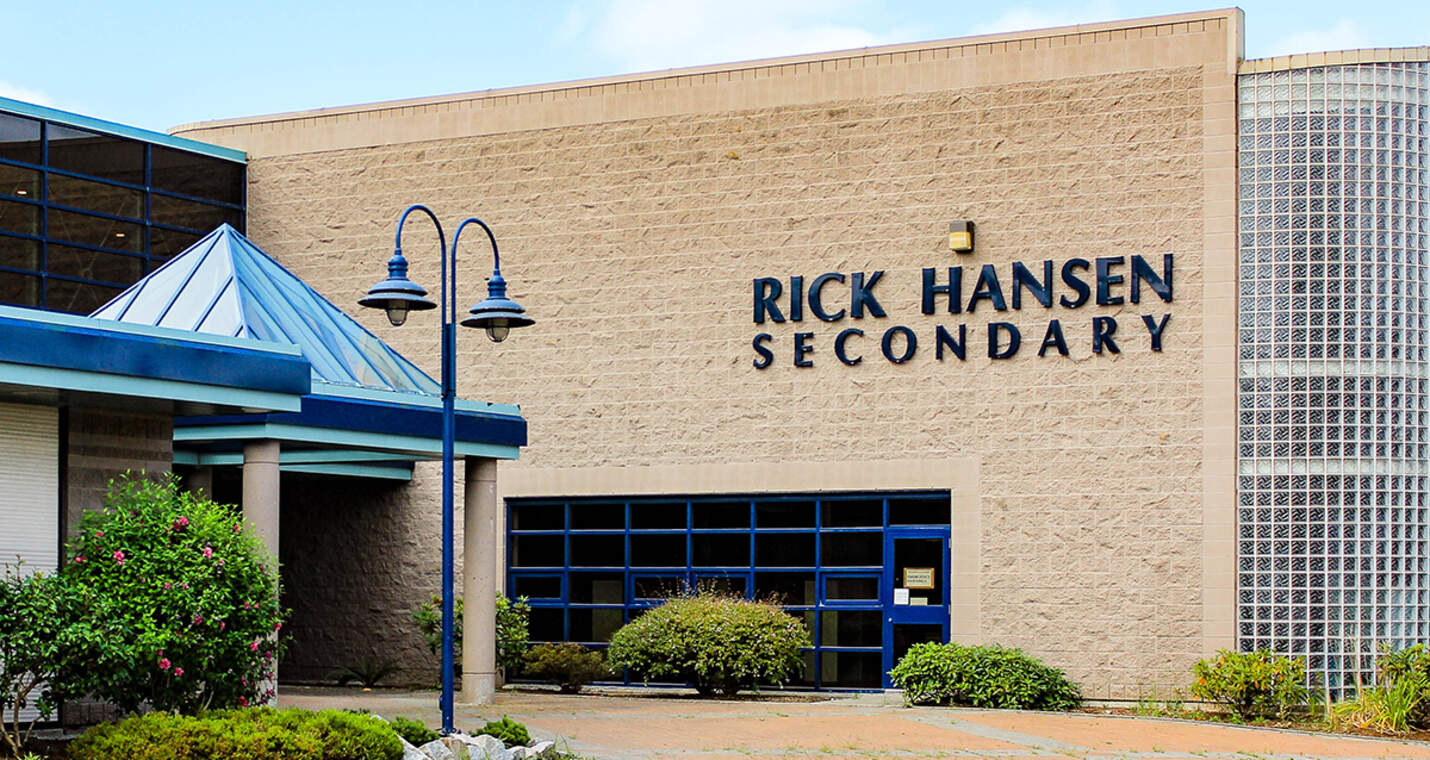

Location
- 31150 Blueridge Dr; Abbotsford, British Columbia, V2T 5R2; Canada
- Coordinates: 49.0672°N 122.3617°W

Information
- School type: Public, high school
- Motto: "Be The Best You Can Be"
- Opened: September 22, 1993
- School district: School District 34 Abbotsford
- School number: 3434052
- Principal: Jaimie Webster
- Staff: 72
- Grades: 9-12
- Enrollment: 900-1000 (2022-2023)
- Language: English
- Colours: Navy Blue, Gold, and White
- Mascot: St. Elmo
- Team name: Hurricanes
- Communities served: Townline Hill
- Website: rickhansen.abbyschools.ca

Rick Hansen Secondary is a public high school in the neighborhood of Townline Hill, located in the west part of Abbotsford, British Columbia. It is part of School District 34 Abbotsford.

Rick Hansen Secondary School (RHSS) is named after Rick Hansen, an athlete who won all-star awards in five sports when he was paralyzed at the age of 15 after being thrown from the back of a truck. He subsequently became a paraplegic athlete and activist for people with spinal cord injuries. The school usually takes in graduates from the nearby Eugene Reimer Middle School, and serves a predominantly Desi & South East Asian community.

In 2015–2016, the school suspended many of its programs such as various clubs, sports teams, concert band and its cafeteria due to the low number of students. The school saw record low enrolment as recent as 2016 and 2017, where it dropped to 591 students, compared to 938 in 2007.

On October 19, 2020, a student collapsed and died following a medical incident in class.

The school is a sister school to Rick Hansen Secondary School in Mississauga, Ontario.

== School of Business & Science ==
In 2015, the school opened B.C.’s "first science and business school." Eligible students were able to earn college-level credits, attend college lectures, and take internships to gain experience.

== Athletics ==
The school has teams in football, rugby union, wrestling, ultimate frisbee, basketball, volleyball, track and field, cross country running and soccer.

- 2018 Grade 9 boys Basketball Provincial Champions
- 2017 Provincial AAA Sr. Boys Basketball Champions
- 2001 Junior Football Provincial Champions
- 2004 AAA Football Provincial Champions
- 2004 Provincial Boys Wrestling Champions
- 2006 Provincial Boys Wrestling Champions
- 2011 Provincial Boys Wrestling Champions
- 2012 provincial Boys Wrestling Champions

== Controversies ==
Rick Hansen Secondary is much known in Abbotsford for its apparent gang and drug problem, however this is highly disputed. The school is most notable for incidents such as when in March 2011, 3 students set fire to various towel dispensers in the school's bathrooms. Another incident includes when in October 2013, a 17-year-old student was assaulted with a collapsible baton in the boys’ locker room by another 16-year-old student.

== Notable alumni ==
- Jacob Doerksen, basketball player
