= Mickey Fox =

American basketball player and coach

Personal information
- Born: May 30, 1953 (age 73) Forest Hill, New York, U.S.
- Listed height: 6 ft 3 in (1.91 m)

Career information
- High school: St. John's Preparatory (Queens, New York)
- College: Saint Mary's University (1971-75; 1978-79)
- NBA draft: 1975: 10th round, 169th overall pick
- Drafted by: Detroit Pistons
- Position: Shooting guard
- Number: 13

Career highlights
- 3× CIAU First-team All-Canadian (1974, 1975, 1979); Second-team All-Canadian (1973); 2× CIAU Tournament MVP (1973, 1979); 3× CIAU Tournament All-star (1973, 1974, 1979); 2x CIAU Champion (1973, 1979); 5x Conference All-star (1972, 1973, 1974, 1975, 1979); Saint Mary's University Athlete of the Year (1973)
- Stats at Basketball Reference

Mickey Fox (born May 30, 1953) is a former American basketball player and coach. He has been described as being arguably the best basketball player in the history of Nova Scotia and being one of the best basketball players in Canada's history. He was a four-time Canadian university ("CIAU") All-Canadian; two-time CIAU tournament MVP; two-time CIAU champion; a five-time conference all-star; and was drafted by the Detroit Pistons in the 1975 NBA draft and by the Portland Trail Blazers in the 1979 NBA draft.

== University ==
Fox is originally from Forest Hill, New York and played at the high school level at St. John's Preparatory. He was recruited to play at Saint Mary's University ("SMU") in Halifax, Nova Scotia by legendary coach Brian Heaney. Fox played for SMU for four seasons from 1971 to 1975 and then returned for the 1978–79 season while pursuing a graduate degree after the CIAU increased player eligibility from four years to five.

Fox achieved some of the most selective accomplishments in CIAU history. Fox was a four-time CIAU All-Canadian, three times as a First-team All-Canadian (1974, 1975, 1979) and once as a Second-team All-Canadian (1973). There have only been 18 three-time First-team All-Canadians and only 14 four-time All-Canadians in Canadian university basketball history. Fox was the second athlete in CIAU basketball history to be four-time All-Canadian, the first being Rod Dean.

This is more selective than being the CIAU MVP, of which there have been 41 unique recipients in history.

Fox was named the CIAU tournament MVP twice (1973, 1979). He was the first athlete to win the award twice and since, only five other athletes have done so (Eli Pasquale, Osvaldo Jeanty, Michael Smart, Tyson Hinz and Philip Scrubb).

Similarly, Fox was named a CIAU tournament all-star three times. He was the third player in CIAU history to do so (with his coach Brian Heaney doing so as a player before Fox) and only 13 players have done so after Fox.

Fox was also a five-time conference all-star and was named SMU's male athlete of the year in 1973.

In the 1972–73 season, he led the SMU Huskies to their first CIAU national championship in program history. He scored 32 points in the semi-final game against the University of Windsor and 39 points (nearly half of SMU's points) in the championship game against Lakehead University.

Similarly, in the 1978–79 season, he led SMU to another CIAU championship. He scored 101 points in SMU's three games of the tournament, which is still a CIAU record. This includes 37 points against the University of Victoria in the championship game.

In other seasons in which SMU did not win the national title, SMU still performed well under Fox's leadership. The Huskies lost in the CIAU championship game by two points to University of Guelph in the 1973–74 season. And the Huskies finished in third place in the CIAU tournament in the 1974–75 season.

Fox set many SMU records during his career. He graduated with the most career regular season points scored (1,646) and the second-highest career regular season points per game at SMU (21.7). He graduated with the most points in a single season (414) and the second-highest points per game in a season (29.5) at SMU. He has the most playoff points at SMU (297), over 100 more than the runner up (189). He also has the highest playoff points per game at SMU (27.0). His 39 points against Lakehead in the 1973 championship game constitutes the most points scored in a playoff game by an SMU player. Of the top 10 performances of most points in a single playoff game among SMU players, 5 of those performances are from Fox.

=== Overall university statistics ===
| Year | Team | GP | FG | FG% | FT | FT% | Rbds | RPG | Pts | PPG |
|---|---|---|---|---|---|---|---|---|---|---|
| 1971–72 | SMU | 12 | | | | | | | 244 | 20.3 |
| 1972–73 | SMU | 20 | | | | | | | 420 | 21.0 |
| 1973–74 | SMU | 19 | 120-254 | 47.2 | 45-59 | 76.3 | | | 368 | 19.4 |
| 1974–75 | SMU | 15 | 157-332 | 47.3 | 66-85 | 77.6 | 71 | 4.7 | 396 | 26.4 |
| 1978–79 | SMU | 43 | 464-875 | 53.0 | 139-168 | 82.7 | 148 | 3.4 | 1067 | 24.8 |
| Career | SMU | 109 | | | | | | | 2495 | 22.9 |

== Professional ==
Fox was drafted by the Detroit Pistons in the 10th round and 169th overall pick in the 1975 NBA draft and by the Portland Trail Blazers in the 3rd round and 56th overall pick in the 1978 NBA draft.

== Coaching ==
Fox was an assistant coach at SMU in the 1975-76 season, where SMU again placed second in the CIAU national tournament. Fox was the head coach of the SMU women's team in the 1976-77 season, where SMU finished 6th overall in the national tournament and were conference champions. In 1992, Fox was the head coach for the Halifax Windjammers in the World Basketball League, the first professional basketball team in Halifax.

== Post-career recognition ==
Fox was inducted into SMU Sport Hall of Fame in 2000 and into the Nova Scotia Sport Hall of Fame in 2009. The 1973 and 1979 SMU basketball teams, of which Fox was part, were also inducted in the SMU Sport Hall of Fame.

== Personal life ==
Fox is a native of Forest Hills, New York. His three children also played university basketball. He has been a motivational speaker, speaking to youth about drugs and alcohol, in addition to serving at basketball camps and clinics. He has been an elementary and junior high teacher; the technical director of Basketball Nova Scotia; and a basketball clinician at the Mentor to Children organization.
