= Jacob Doerksen =

Canadian basketball player

Jacob Luke Doerksen (born October 16, 1987) is a Canadian former professional basketball player.

== Career ==
A native of Abbotsford, British Columbia, Doerksen played basketball and football at Rick Hansen Secondary School, he was named the British Columbia High School Male Athlete of the Year in 2005. In 2005, the 6 feet 7 inches (201 cm) forward enrolled at University of Victoria and won the Dr. Peter Mullins Trophy as CIS Rookie of the Year in the 2005–06 season after helping the Vikes claim a CIS National Championship silver medal. In his second year at Victoria, Doerksen averaged a team-high 14 points a game, while grabbing just under five rebounds per contest.

After sitting out the 2007–08 season, Doerksen transferred to Trinity Western University in 2008. He would later be named "arguably the greatest basketball player to ever don a Spartans uniform". He scored a total of 1852 points in his three years at Trinity Western putting him second on the TWU all-time list when he graduated in 2011. His 781 rebounds were also second-most all time in TWU history. He earned several awards during his time at Trinity Western, including the Mike Moser Memorial Trophy as the outstanding player of the 2008–09 CIS season, First-Team All-Canada accolades in 2009 and 2011 as well as Canada West Player of the Year honours in 2009.

In his first year as a professional basketball player, he tallied 21.7 points, 7.7 rebounds and two steals a game in 33 contests with the UBC Hannover Tigers of the German 2. Bundesliga ProB league, earning 2012 Eurobasket.com All-German 2.Bundesliga Pro B Center of the Year honours. Prior to the 2012–13 season, he signed with SC Rasta Vechta of Germany's second-tier 2. Bundesliga ProA. He helped Rasta win the 2013 ProA championship title which ensured promotion to the Basketball Bundesliga, averaging 13.7 points a game. In the 2013–14 he saw the hardwood in 29 games (28 starts) to average 10.4 points and 4.6 rebounds per contest.

Following the 2013–14 season, Doerksen finished his professional basketball career returning to his native Canada.
