= Karl Tilleman =

Former Canadian Basketball Player and American attorney

Personal information
- Born: November 1, 1960 (age 66) Ogden, Utah, U.S.
- Listed height: 6 ft 2 in (1.88 m)
- Listed weight: 183 lb (83 kg)

Career information
- High school: Sir Winston Churchill (Calgary, Alberta)
- College: Calgary (1980–1984); BYU Law (1987-1990, not as a player)
- NBA draft: 1984: 4th round, 79th overall pick
- Drafted by: Denver Nuggets
- Position: Shooting guard
- Number: 30, 32, 7

Career highlights
- 2× CIAU Player of the Year (1982, 1983); 2× CIAU scoring champion (1982, 1983); 4× CIAU First Team All-Canadian (1981–1984); 3× CWUAA Player of the Year (1981–1983); 3× CWUAA Scoring Champion (1982–1984); 4× CWUAA First Team All-Star (1981–1984); CWUAA Second Team All-Star (1980); City of Calgary Male Athlete of the Year (1983); 2× University of Calgary Male Athlete of the Year (1981, 1983)
- Stats at Basketball Reference

Karl Michael Tilleman (born November 1, 1960) is a Canadian former basketball player, two-time Olympian and currently an attorney. Tilleman holds the Olympic records for the most three-point field goals in a single game (10) and half (8) Consequently, Tilleman's national team coach and FIBA Hall of Fame inductee Jack Donohue described Tilleman as "the best three-point shooter in the world".

Tilleman is a two-time Olympian, representing Canada in the 1984 and 1988 Olympics. Tilleman was drafted by the Denver Nuggets as their second pick and the 79th overall pick in 1984.

Tilleman also broke many records during his tenure at the University of Calgary. Tilleman was awarded the Mike Mosier Trophy as the male Canadian University player of the year in 1982 and 1983, the first player to win the award two years consecutively. In the 1981–82 season, Tilleman averaged 32.9 points per game (before the implementation of the three-point line in Canadian university basketball), which broke the CIAU's previous points per game record. Tilleman was the CIAU scoring champion two years in a row and a four-time CIAU First Team All-Canadian. Tilleman graduated as the University of Calgary's all-time leading scorer with 25.9 points per game in 79 games for a total of 2050 career points. Tilleman was voted the greatest athlete in University of Calgary history, receiving more than five times the votes of the runner-up.

In his legal career, Tilleman was a law clerk for former Chief Justice Warren Burger and Justice Clarence Thomas at the Supreme Court of the United States in 1992–93. Tilleman has been the managing partner at Steptoe & Johnson's Phoenix office, is currently a partner at the Dentons law firm (the largest law firm in the world) and has represented many high-profile clients including the Harlem Globetrotters, the University of Southern California, Western Union, State Farm, AIG, and Metlife, Inc.

In his volunteer service in The Church of Jesus Christ of Latter-Day Saints, Tilleman has served as a bishop and stake president in Phoenix, Arizona, as mission president of the Canada Vancouver Mission, and as and Area Seventy in the Church's North America Southwest Area.

== International career ==
Tilleman played for the Canadian Men's National Team from 1981 to 1984 and then from 1986 to 1988. In this, Tilleman represented Canada in the 1984 and 1988 Olympics. Brian Heaney, Canada Basketball Hall of Fame inductee as both a player and coach, stated that "there has never been a finer shooter in Canadian basketball history than Karl Tilleman".

=== 1984 Olympics ===
Canada placed fourth in the 1984 Olympics after narrowly losing to Yugoslavia in the bronze medal game. Tilleman achieved the highest points per minute among any Canadian in these 1984 games (with a minimum of 50 minutes played).

In Canada's first game against the US in the 1984 games, Tilleman was Canada's second leading scorer with 10 points in only 7 minutes while shooting 70% from the field In Canada's game against Uruguay (which Canada needed to win to compete for a medal), Tilleman helped Canada win the game by scoring 12 points while shooting 50% from the field. In Canada's quarterfinal game against Italy (again which Canada needed to win to compete for a medal), Tilleman scored at critical times to cut Italy's lead from 11 to 9, to tie the game and later to go up by 2 points. Tilleman's 10 points at 45% shooting helped Canada win to eventually compete for the bronze medal.

In the 1984 bronze-medal game, Tilleman was again Canada's second-leading scorer with 13 points (shooting 60% from the field) in a hard-fought loss to Yugoslavia where Canada pulled to within one point with one minute left in the game. This was an important game in Canadian basketball history, seeing that it is the only time in 80+ years where Canada has had a legitimate chance of winning an Olympic medal in basketball.

=== 1988 Olympics ===
After interrupting his basketball career to serve a mission for his church, Tilleman continued to represent Canada from 1986 through the 1988 Summer Olympics in Seoul, Korea. Canada finished 6th overall in these Olympics.

On September 23, 1988, Tilleman made ten (10) three-point field goals against Spain for a total of 37 points. Spain had won the silver medal in the previous 1984 Olympics. Tilleman's performance against Spain in 1988 set the record of most three-point field goals made in a single Olympic game. This record has not been broken, but has been tied twice, notably by the all-time leader in Olympic scoring, Oscar Schmidt.

Before setting this record against Spain, Tilleman tied the record for most three-point field goals made in a single Olympic game when he hit seven three-pointers against Egypt on September 21, 1988, for a total of 29 points.

In his September 23, 1988 performance against Spain, Tilleman made eight of his ten three-pointers in the second half, which set the record for most three-pointers made in an Olympic half. In his performance against Spain, he scored 21 points in a row for Canada.

In these 1988 Olympic games, Tilleman achieved the second-highest points per minute among all Olympians second only to Oscar Schmidt, with Oscar Schmidt averaging more than a point per minute with his 42.3 points per game, which points per game is the highest average of any Olympic tournament. Tilleman was Canada's second overall scorer in the 1988 Olympic games.

Because the three-point line was implemented in Olympic basketball in 1988, Tilleman only had one Olympic tournament with the three-point line. However, with only his three-point field goals made in 1988, Tilleman leads all Canadian Olympians in Olympic three-pointers made.

=== Additional National Team Tournaments ===
Tilleman represented Canada in the 1983 Pan American Games. Tilleman scored 26 points against the Michael Jordan-led USA team. This was a close game, having been tied 15 times. In these 1983 Pan American games, Tilleman scored 22 points in the second half against Puerto Rico, six of which were consecutive to give Canada an 84-79 leads with two and a half minutes remaining in the game.

Tilleman represented Canada in the 1987 World Student Games, also known as the Universiade. Tilleman led all scorers when he scored 21 of Canada's 83 points (1/4 of Canada's points) in their game against the USA. This was a close game, with US records documenting that "Canada challenged the U.S. men all the way". This was a talented US team coached by Mike Krzyzewski and led by future NBA All-Stars B. J. Armstrong and Mitch Richmond.

In 1983, Tilleman represented Canada on the team that won Gold in the World Student Games held in Edmonton, Alberta, Canada. This was one of the finest moments in Canadian basketball history, being the only time in which Canada has won the gold medal in an international basketball tournament

== NBA Draft / NCAA / Semi-Pro Competition ==
Tilleman was drafted in the fourth round of the 1984 NBA Draft by the Denver Nuggets as the 79th overall pick. Tilleman is the fourth highest NBA draft pick in history among Canadian University basketball players. Tilleman is the only University of Calgary athlete to be drafted into the NBA.

In 1986 while playing for the semi-pro team the Calgary 88's, Tilleman scored 50 points against the Montana State Bobcats and made thirteen three-point field goals in doing so. This set the record for the most points scored by a single player in a game on Montana State's Worthington Arena. Montana State won the Big Sky Conference title that year, resulting in this Montana State team being inducted into the Montana State Athletics Hall of Fame.

Tilleman also competed in the 1983 Western Invitation Tournament ("WIT"). This tournament included AAU teams, amateur teams and teams from the Big Sky, WAC and PAC 10 conferences along with NBA scouts attending. In this tournament, Tilleman averaged 41.25 points.

== University ==
Tilleman started for the University of Calgary from 1979 to 1984. Tilleman was awarded the Mike Mosier Trophy as the male Canadian University player of the year in 1982 and 1983, the first player to win the award two years consecutively. Tilleman was the first University of Calgary athlete to win the Mike Moser award.

In the 1981–82 season, Tilleman averaged 32.9 points per game (before the implementation of the three-point line in Canadian university basketball), which broke the CIAU's previous points per game record. Tilleman was the CIAU scoring champion two years in a row and a four-time CIAU First Team All-Canadian. For context, in the history of Canada university basketball, only five other athletes have been named a First Team All-Canadian four times: John Carson, David Coulthard, Byron Tokarchuk, John Stiefelmeyer and Philip Scrubb. Tilleman graduated as the University of Calgary's all-time leading scorer with 25.9 points per game in 79 games for a total of 2050 career points.

Tilleman was the Canada West scoring champion three consecutive years. Tilleman also was named Canada West conference player of the year three consecutive years. In his final four years, Tilleman was also unanimously named a first-team Canada West all-star. In his freshman year, Tilleman was named a second-team Canada West all-star.

Tilleman was named the City of Calgary Male Athlete of the Year by the Calgary Sports Media in 1983 and the University of Calgary Male Athlete of the Year in 1981 and 1983.

In the 1983–84 regular season, Tilleman made every free throw he attempted except one, resulting in a record-setting 98% free throw percentage that has never been broken by any Canadian or U.S. university player.

=== University Statistics ===
Year	Team	GP	FG	FG%	FT	FT%	Rbds	RPG	Pts	PPG
1979-80	Calgary	20	124-253	49.0	13-17	76.5	38	1.9	261	13.1
1980-81	Calgary	20	246-440	55.9	58-65	89.2	96	4.8	550	27.5
1981-82	Calgary	20	287-617	46.5	83-103	80.6	163	8.2	657	32.9
1982-83	Calgary	10	133-258	51.6	35-47	74.5	41	4.1	301	30.1
1983-84	Calgary	9	115-237	48.5	51-52	98.1	47	5.2	281	31.2
Career	Calgary	79	905-1805	50.1	240-284	84.5	385	4.9	2050	25.9

== Post-career awards ==
After his final season game for the University of Calgary, Tilleman's number 30 jersey was retired by the university. Tilleman was the first University of Calgary athlete to have his jersey retired by the department. In 1995, Tilleman was inducted into the university's athletic hall of fame. Tilleman was the first UoC basketball player inducted into the university's hall of fame.

On April 5, 2007, as part of a celebration of the university's 40th anniversary, Tilleman was voted on an online poll as the university's all-time greatest athlete, receiving 26 percent of the votes, more than five times the votes of any other athlete.

In 2008, Tilleman was inducted into the Alberta Sports Hall of Fame. In 2020, Tilleman was inducted into the Canada West Hall of Fame. In 2024, Tilleman was inducted into the Canada Basketball Hall of Fame.

== Legal career ==
After graduating from the University of Calgary, Tilleman studied at the Brigham Young University's J. Reuben Clark Law School, eventually graduating summa cum laude ("with highest distinction"), Order of the Coif in 1990 while also serving as the Editor-in-Chief of the BYU Law Review. Tilleman's record-setting performance in the 1988 Olympics was noteworthy in that he was already in his second year of law school, and competing for the top spot in his law-school class, while at the same time training for, and then representing Canada in, the 1988 Olympics. No other Canadian Olympian has also been selected as a law clerk by a Justice of the Supreme Court of the United States.

After graduation, he clerked for Hon. John T. Noonan of the United States Court of Appeals, Ninth Circuit from 1990 to 1991. A year later, Tilleman was selected as a law clerk by both Chief Justice Warren Burger and Justice Clarence Thomas at the United States Supreme Court from 1992 to 1993. He and Nick Bravin appear to be the only Olympians to also clerk for a U.S. Supreme Court Justice.

From 2000 through 2019, Tilleman was a partner at Steptoe & Johnson, where he was appointed managing partner of Steptoe's Phoenix office. His practice at Steptoe, and now at Dentons, focuses on litigating antitrust, intellectual property, RICO, complex contract, and high-profile insurance disputes.

He has earned recognition as an attorney, which include being selected to Best Lawyers in America for insurance law from 2011–present; Southwest Super Lawyers for business litigation from 2009 to 2018; Chambers USA: America's Leading Business Lawyers for general commercial litigation from 2011 to 2012 and from 2019 to 2023; and The Legal 500 United States in 2017 as a leading lawyer in commercial litigation, international litigation and advice to insurers.

His clients include high-profile insurance, money transfer and entertainment companies. In a non-exclusive list, he was the lead trial lawyer for the Harlem Globetrotters in an intellectual property action filed in federal court by former Globetrotter superstars Meadowlark Lemon, Curly Neal, and others; Tilleman represented the University of Southern California in a multi-million antitrust and RICO lawsuit; he has represented Western Union in various financial transaction cases, as well as State Farm, Allstate, AIG, and Metlife in numerous high-profile insurance cases.

Additionally, Tilleman was interviewed by the White House for an appointment as a federal court judge; however, he declined the appointment upon realizing the appointment would change his priorities.

== LDS Church service ==
In between his Olympic performances, Tilleman served as a full-time missionary for the Church of Jesus Christ of Latter-day Saints (LDS Church) in the California Arcadia Mission, speaking Spanish and working in Latino neighborhoods throughout the Los Angeles area. Additionally, while living in Phoenix, he was called to serve as a bishop and as a stake president.

On March 26, 2011, he accepted a three-year assignment from the Church to serve as the mission president of the Canada Vancouver Mission. He put his legal practice on hold to fulfill the assignment, which ended on July 1, 2014.

While serving as a mission president, Tilleman suffered a devastating fall after being attacked by a bull mastiff dog, which left him paralyzed from the neck down because of the trauma, including a tear in the center of his spinal cord. He fought to overcome that paralyzing and potentially life-threatening injury to complete his three-year term as a mission president and then continue his practice of law with Steptoe & Johnson.

Tilleman served as an Area Seventy in the Church's North America Southwest Area from April 2015 to October 2020.

== Personal life ==
Tilleman was born in Ogden, Utah to Bill and Jean Tilleman. He moved to Calgary, Alberta, Canada, as a young boy when his father accepted a teaching position at the University of Calgary.

Tilleman and his wife, Holly Benson Walker Tilleman, have been married since 1986, and have five children together: Karl Benson, Daniel William, Mary Barbara-Jean (Caywood), Michael Robert, and Sarah Elizabeth.

== See also ==
- List of law clerks for the chief justice of the United States
- List of law clerks for the tenth seat of the Supreme Court of the United States
