= Rod Dean =

Former American Basketball Player

Personal information
- Listed height: 6 ft 3 in (1.91 m)

Career information
- High school: Upper Sandusky High School (Upper Sandusky, Ohio)
- College: Ohio State (1968-1969); Wilfrid Laurier University (formerly known as Waterloo Lutheran University until 1973) (1970-1974)
- Position: Shooting guard
- Number: 3

Career highlights
- 4x Canadian University ("CIAU") All-Canadian (1971, 1972, 1973, 1974); CIAU Tournament All-star (1971); OIAA Conference First-team All-star (1971); 3x OUA Conference First-team All-star (1972, 1973, 1974); Wilfrid Laurier University Sports Hall of Fame (1986)

Rod Dean is a former American basketball player. He has been described as "one of the greatest Canadian collegiate basketball players of all-time". He was the first four-time Canadian university ("CIAU") All-Canadian in basketball and remains one of the only athletes in history to accomplish this feat.

== High school ==
Dean played at the high school level at Upper Sandusky High School in Upper Sandusky, Ohio. He was an All-Northern Ohio League first-team selection his senior season (1967–1968), where he averaged 16.3 points per game.

== University ==
Dean played his freshman season (1968–69) at Ohio State University. Dean then transferred to Waterloo Lutheran University (renamed Wilfrid Laurier University in 1973) in the CIAU for the 1970–1971 season.

While at Waterloo Lutheran, ("WLU") Dean was selected as CIAU All-Canadian four times: once as a First-team All-Canadian (1971) and three times as a Second-team All-Canadian (1972, 1973, 1974). Dean was the first athlete in CIAU basketball history to be a four-time All-Canadian. Since Dean, only 13 other athletes have accomplished this feat. This is more selective than being named CIAU basketball player of the year, of which there have been 41 unique recipients.

In the 1970–71 season, Dean led Waterloo Lutheran to a fifth overall finish in the CIAU tournament. This season, he was named as a CIAU tournament all-star.

Dean also received recognition at the conference level. WLU was part of the Ontario Intercollegiate Athletic Conference ("OIAA") during Dean's first season (1970–71), with the OIAA being reformed into the Ontario Athletics Association ("OUA") the following season. Dean was a four-time First-team All-Conference selection (1971, 1972, 1973, 1974). In the 1972–73 season, Dean was second overall in the OUA in scoring.

Dean also received recognition at the WLU team level. He was named team MVP twice (1973, 1974) and was named rookie of the year his first season with the team (1971).

Dean set many school records. He graduated with the most career regular season points in WLU history and currently ranks 8th overall, despite having played many fewer career games other WLU historic players. In the 1972–73 season, he set the WLU record for highest regular season points per game (22.7). Dean also ranks ninth overall in WLU career playoff points.

=== University regular season statistics ===
Year	Team	GP	FG	FG%	FT	FT%	Rbds	RPG	Pts	PPG
1970-71	Waterloo Lutheran	10							199	19.9
1971-72	Waterloo Lutheran	10	60-143	42.0	64-83	77.1	68	6.8	184	18.4
1972-73	Waterloo Lutheran	12	109-211	51.7	54-72	75.0	87	7.2	272	22.7
1973-74	Laurier	12	83-219	37.9	61-80	76.2	77	6.4	227	18.9
Career	Waterloo Lutheran / Laurier	44	252-573	44.0	179-235	76.2	232	5.3	882	20.0

== Post-career recognition ==
Dean was inducted into WLU's athletic hall of fame in 1986 as part of its first inductee class. Dean was inducted into the Wyandot Sports Hall of Fame (2023), which recognizes athletic achievements in Wyandot County, Ohio. The Canada One Foundation, an organization run by Canadian national team alumni to preserve Canada basketball history, ranked Dean as one of the top 150 players in Canadian basketball history.
