= Tyson Hinz =

Canadian basketball player

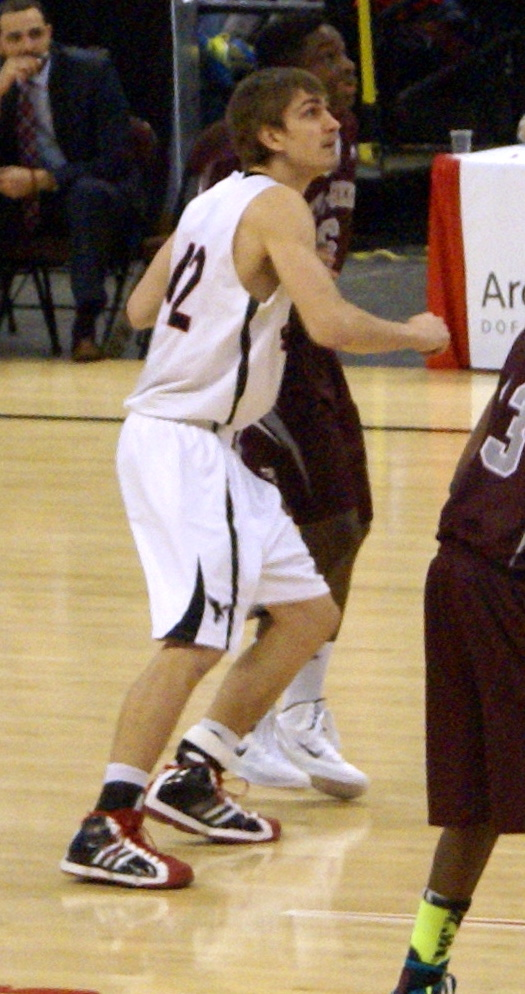
- Hinz playing for Carleton in 2014

Personal information
- Born: October 12, 1991 (age 35) Sherbrooke, Quebec, Canada
- Listed height: 6 ft 7 in (2.01 m)
- Listed weight: 225 lb (102 kg)

Career information
- High school: St. Matthew, (Ottawa)
- College: Carleton (2009–2014)
- NBA draft: 2014: undrafted
- Playing career: 2014–2017
- Position: Power forward
- Number: 42

Career history
- 2014–2016: Landstede Zwolle
- 2016–2017: Mitteldeutscher BC

Career highlights
- German ProA champion (2017); All-DBL Team (2016); 2× DBL All-Star (2015, 2016); CIS Champion 2011-2014; CIS Player of the Year (2011); CIS Tournament MVP (2011); OUA Male Athlete of the Year (2011); Lois and Doug Mitchell Award Winner (2011)
Medals
Men's basketball
Representing Canada
Universiade
Silver medal – second place	2011 Shenzhen	National team

Tyson Boyd Hinz (born October 12, 1991) is a Canadian former professional basketball player. Hinz played the power forward position, and last played for Mitteldeutscher BC of the German ProA.

== College career ==
Hinz enjoyed a decorated career at Carleton University, winning four straight CIS championships with the Ravens. In 2011, Hinz was presented with the Mike Moser Memorial Trophy as the CIS Outstanding Player and won the Jack Donohue Trophy (MVP of CIS Championship) twice (2011, 2014). In 2011, Hinz also won the OUA and the Canadian University Male Athlete of the Year award.

He received All-Canada First Team honours in 2011, 2012 and 2013 as well as Second Team honors in 2014.

In his last season with Carleton (2013–14), Hinz averaged 17 points and 6 rebounds per game. He was also named the CIS Tournament MVP and was named an Academic All-Canadian in the same season.

== Professional career ==
Hinz started his professional career in the 2014–15 season, with Landstede Basketbal in the Netherlands. He finished 4th with Landstede, and the team was defeated in the playoff semifinals. Hinz averaged 13.1 points over the DBL regular season. He re-signed with Landstede for the 2015–16 season. That season, Hinz was named to the All-DBL Team.

On August 3, 2016, Hinz signed with Mitteldeutscher BC of the German second-tier ProA. Averaging 8.4 points and 3.9 rebounds in 18 minutes per contest, he helped them capture the 2017 ProA title.

== International play ==
Hinz competed with Team Canada in the 2011 Pan American Games in Mexico and was a key-part of Canada’s silver-winning squad at the 2011 World University Games in China. He averaged 15.9 points, 5.3 boards and 2.1 assists a game during the tournament, while receiving eurobasket.com All-World University Games First Team honors.

== Statistics ==
According to FIBA:
Season	Team	League	PPG	RPG	APG	EFF
2014–15	Landstede Basketbal	DBL	13.1	6.6	1.3	17.6
2015–16	Landstede Basketbal	DBL	13.3	7.5	1.8	19.4
2016-17	Mitteldeutscher BC	G Pro A	8.4	3.9	1.6	13.9

== Retirement ==
Hinz ended his professional basketball career in 2017 and began a new career in digital marketing working for WebMarketers, a local digital marketing agency in Ottawa as the Chief Operating Officer. Hinz is now a high school teacher within the OCDSB.
