= Andrew Spagrud =

Canadian basketball player

Andrew Spagrud (born November 2, 1985) is a Canadian basketball player who played for the University of Saskatchewan Huskies in Saskatoon. He played professional basketball for the Sundsvall Dragons of the Swedish Ligan. In November 2010 he moved to Ostrava in the Czech republic to play for NH Ostrava of the Mattoni NBL.

Spagrud played at the University of Saskatchewan from 2003 to 2008. He was named the CIS National Freshman of the Year in 2003–04, and went on to earn All-Canadian honours the next four seasons. He was a First Team All-Canadian three times (2004–05, 2006–07, 2007–08) and a Second Team All-Canadian once (2005–06).

He is the all-time leading scorer (3826 points) and rebounder (1763 rebounds) at the University of Saskatchewan. He is also the leading scorer in Canada West Conference history (2182 points).
