= New Zealand national Australian rules football team =

New Zealand
- Nickname(s): Falcons
- Head coach: Rob Maone
- Captain: Andrew Howison
- Home stadium: Hnry Stadium, Wellington; Hutt Park, Lower Hutt

Rankings
- Current: 3rd (as of October 2022)

First international
- New Zealand 63–62 New South Wales (19 August 1908; Melbourne Cricket Ground)

Biggest win
- New Zealand 229–0 India (29 August 2008; Royal Park, Melbourne) (world record)

Biggest defeat
- New Zealand 28–75 Papua New Guinea (19 August 2014; Royal Park, Melbourne)

International Cup
- Appearances: 6 (First in 2002)
- Best result: 1st (2005)

The New Zealand national Australian rules football team (Māori: tīmi whutupaoro Ahitereiria o Aotearoa; nicknamed the Falcons (Māori: Ngā Kāhu); previously the Hawks (Māori: Ngā Kārearea), is the national men's team for the sport of Australian rules football in New Zealand. The International Cup team is selected from strict criteria from the best New Zealand born and developed players, primarily from the clubs of the AFL New Zealand. Test and touring squads are selected using similar criteria to other international football codes, additionally allowing players with a New Zealand born parent to play.

New Zealand first competed internationally in 1888 and participated in the 1908 Jubilee Australasian Football Carnival. Since the 1970s it has regularly toured Australia and more recently, has hosted Australian teams.

New Zealand participated in every Australian Football International Cup, taking out the tournament in 2005 and was runner up in 2008 and 2017. New Zealand also competed annually against the AFL Academy from 2012 to 2019. It has competed in the AFL Pacific Cup since 2024. It has never won against Australia, though came within a goal in 2014.

A national women's team formed in 2015 compete under the name of the New Zealand Kahu.

== Identity ==
The NZ side wear a distinctive silver and black uniform which consists of a guernsey (singlet), shorts and socks. The guernsey contains New Zealand's silver fern. Before every match, similar to the all blacks, the NZ team will perform a Haka.

The moniker is the Falcons, having originally adopted the Falcons moniker in 1997. AFL New Zealand sought to change the name to the Hawks in 2017, but reverted to the Falcons in 2021.

== History ==
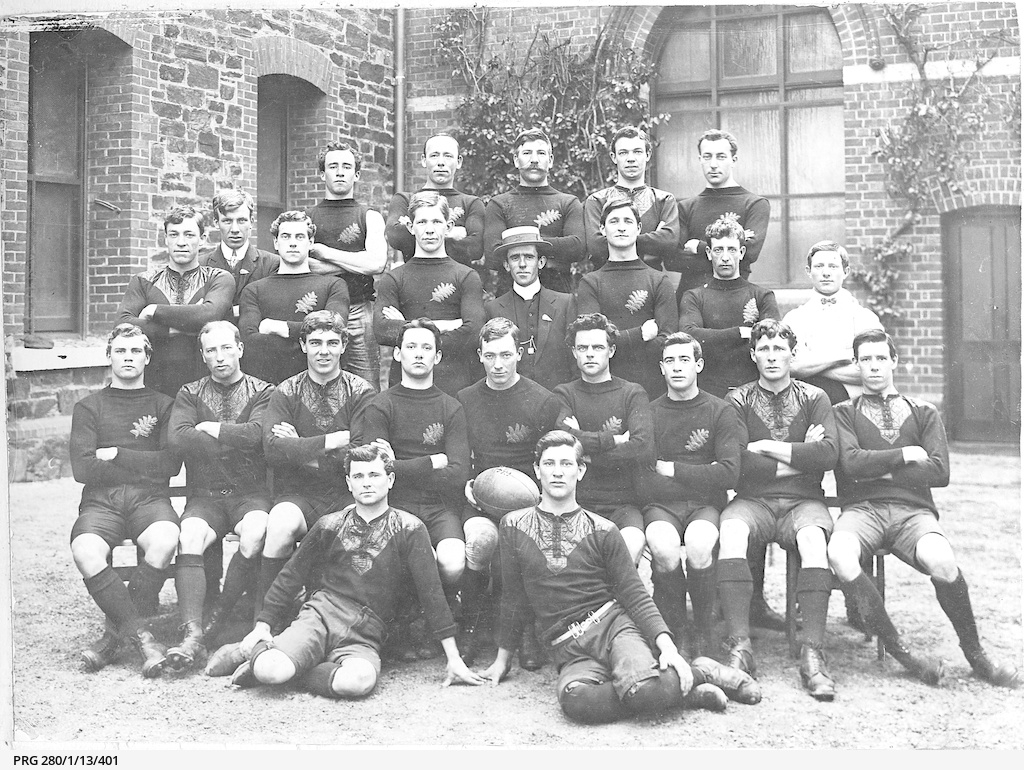
The New Zealand team that played against South Australian state football team on the Adelaide Oval on 1st of September 1908

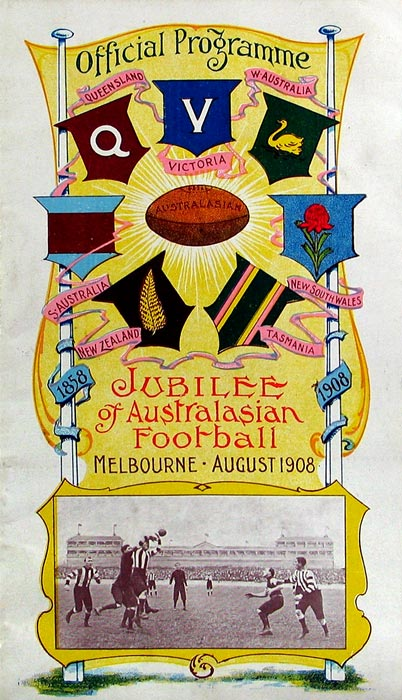
Silver Fern flag on the 1908 Official carnival programme. New Zealand defeated New South Wales and Queensland

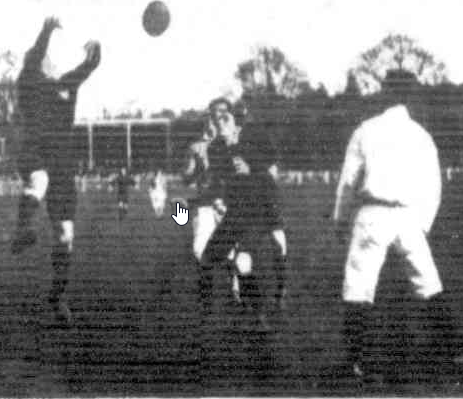
New Zealander high marking in the team's 1908 defeat of New South Wales

=== First New Zealand teams ===
The first Australian Football team from New Zealand was the New Zealand Native football team who competed against the colony of New South Wales in Sydney, on 29 June 1889 with the result being a 4-goal each draw along with matches against Victorian clubs including an impressive two goal win against the powerhouse Victorian club South Melbourne.

In 1905, two New Zealand representatives (one from the North Island and one from the South) attended the Australasian Football Conference where the Australasian Football Council was formed. The national team traces its origins back to the forming of the first national body, the New Zealand Football League, formed in 1907 at the Naval & Family Hotel in Auckland, including representatives from all provinces, which set about planning for the Australian tour, noting the rapidly growing popularity of the code across the country. At the meeting, the NZFL adopted a national code of laws and elected its first president Dr Tracy Inglis.

=== 1908 Jubilee Australasian Football Carnival ===
New Zealand lobbied the Australasian Council to participate in the Jubilee Australasian Football Carnival in 1908. At the time any player registered with the NZFL qualified for selection (similar rules applied to the Australian state sides), as a result there were a number of Australians in the team including some former non-amateurs. At the tournament the touring side defeated both New South Wales and Queensland, it went on to play matches around the country. It was originally known as the "All Blacks" or the "Silver Ferns" like their rugby counterparts, at a time when it was still common for players to switch codes. This was the only time in the history of Australian rules "interstate" football matches that a team from New Zealand participated. It was anticipated that, immediately following the carnival, and before returning to New Zealand, the New Zealand team would play matches in Adelaide, Ballarat, Bendigo, Geelong, Sydney, Brisbane, and Newcastle. New Zealand played a match, in Adelaide, on 1 September 1908 (Eight Hours Day), before the Governor, George Le Hunte, on a very wet ground (in several places the water was inches deep). South Australia won the match 5.8 (38) to 3.10 (28). The match was not as one-sided as the final scores indicate: the score at quarter time was South Australia 4.5 (29) to New Zealand 0.1 (1). In the process of the day, the New Zealand team performed two hakas, one before the match commenced, the other before the second half began. All in all, the New Zealand team won six out of the eleven matches they played on their tour, including the carnival matches against New South Wales and Queensland, and were described in the Melbourne press as "the surprise packet"; and, due to the fact that only two of their matches were played on dry grounds, they also became known as the "wet weather birds".

=== Exclusion from the Australasian Football Council (1910-1914) ===
The Australasian Football Council had decided in 1906 not to support overseas participation and after a long exclusion campaign led by the VFL's representative Con Hickey pushed for New Zealand's membership from the council to be revoked in 1910. New Zealand's expulsion from the council in 1914 spelled the end of its international Australian Football ambitions for more than half a century.

=== Revival ===
The Australian Rules Football Council of New Zealand formed in the early 1980s and began requesting representative matches against the Australian Capital Territory. However it was not invited to any national carnivals until the 1990s.

New Zealand was reintroduced to international Australian Football at the Arafura Games in 1995. The team also competed in the 1997 and 1999 games, winning the Silver medal in each year of the competition as runners up to Papua New Guinea.

The team competed in the inaugural 2002 Australian Football International Cup finishing in 3rd place.

Warming up for the 2005 International Cup, the Falcons played a touring Maffra (from the strong Victorian Country Football League in Gippsland, Victoria, Australia) at Manurewa in New Zealand but were defeated by 70 points, dulling expectations of the team's appearance in the next international event, but at the same time displaying the massive disparity between the competitive level of the sport in the two countries.

However, with the growing popularity of Aussie Rules in New Zealand, the much improved 2005 New Zealand International Cup side went through the competition undefeated, claiming the title of International Champions by defeating Papua New Guinea in the Grand Final at the Melbourne Cricket Ground, effectively claiming the title from previous winners Ireland. The team took most by surprise and no other side was able to come close to winning against them. The Falcon's best and fairest player (from the 2005 International Cup) was Matthew Callaghan.

Following the overwhelming success of the team's 2005 International Cup appearance, the Falcons were invited to play at the Australian Country Championships in 2006 to be held on the Gold Coast. The qualification rules of this competition are more lenient, and the Falcons were able to play non-New Zealand born players to make them competitive against Australian sides from country leagues. The Falcons were not successful at the event, losing heavily to Queensland, by 9 points to Victoria B and by 63 points to the Indigenous All-Stars.

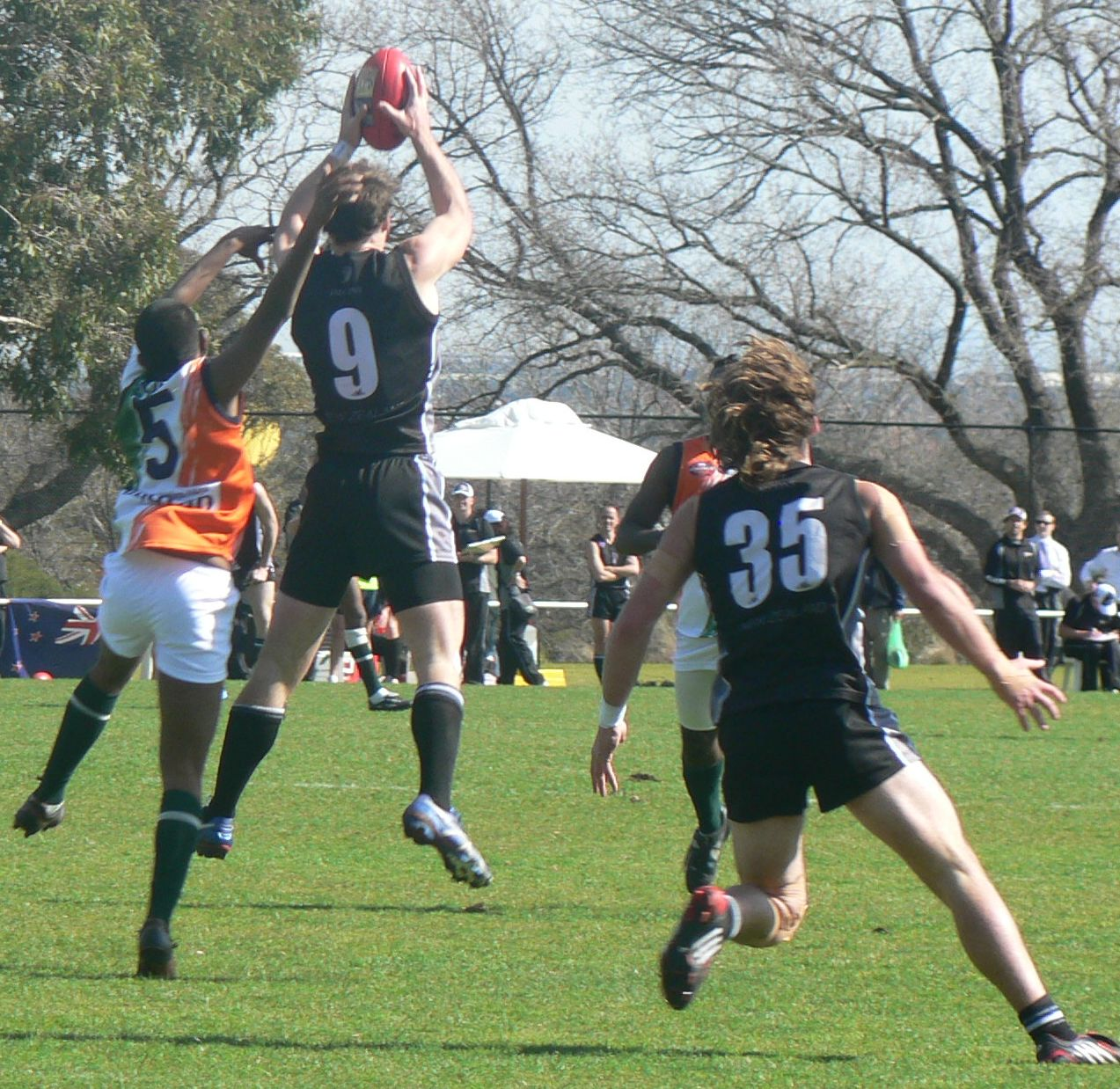
New Zealand captain Andrew Congalton takes a high mark in front of his Indian national team opponent during the 2008 International Cup

Warming up for the 2008 cup, New Zealand were once again convincingly defeated by Maffra. The team, however went on to win all of its first 3 rounds by massive margins, leading its pool by a massive percentage to play-off in the finals against Ireland, Papua New Guinea and South Africa. Though the Falcons lost to a determined Papua New Guinea in the Grand Final. Richard Bradley was the tournament's equal leading goalkicker with Canada's Scott Fleming and was one of three New Zealanders selected in the All-International (world) team.

Since 2009, New Zealand's Under 20s (and the Under 18 since 2011) have competed against the Victorian Amateur Football Association Under 18 squad in Christchurch, Wellington and Auckland. They are yet to defeat the VAFA.

Since 2012 the national side has played against the National Australian Under 17 team (NAB AFL Academy). The first game was won convincingly by the AFL Academy by 91 points. In 2014 New Zealand came within a goal in the final minutes to lose by only 4 points, the closest it has ever come to a historic defeat of Australia at underage level.

== AFL New Zealand sponsors ==
- AFL
- St Kilda Football Club
- Foundation North
- AVJennings
- Sport New Zealand
- Sekem
- New Zealand Racing Board

== International competition ==
=== International Cup ===
- 2002: 3rd
- 2005: 1st
- 2008: 2nd
- 2011: 3rd
- 2014: 3rd
- 2017: 2nd

=== Arafura Games ===
- 1995: 2nd
- 1997: 2nd
- 1999: 2nd
- 2001: Did not enter

=== Pacific Cup ===
- 2024: 3rd

== Squads ==
=== 2017 International Cup squad ===
The following players were included in the squad for the 2017 Australian Football International Cup:

Coach: Rob Malone

Captain: Andrew Howison

Name	Club	League	Region
Aaron Harris	Morningside Panthers	(Australia) QAFL	Brisbane
Adam Simpson	Springwood Pumas	(Australia) QAFL	Brisbane
Andrew Howison	Oakleigh Districts	(Australia) SFNL	Melbourne
Andriu Sucu	North Shore Tigers	(New Zealand) AAFL	Auckland
Andy Christensen	South Melbourne Districts	(Australia) VAFA	Melbourne
Barclay Miller	St Kilda Saints	(Australia) AFL	Melbourne
Ben Hick	University Blues	(New Zealand) AAFL	Auckland
Brandon Sucu	Wilston Grange	(Australia) QAFL	Brisbane
Brendan Clark	Maroochydore Roos	(Australia) QAFL	Brisbane
Carlos Donnell-Brown	Waitakere Magpies	(New Zealand) AAFL	Auckland
Christian Blackie	Otago Hoops	(New Zealand) Otago AFL	Otago
David Rattenbury	Waitakere Magpies	(New Zealand) AAFL	Auckland
Jackson Clince	North Shore Tigers	(New Zealand) AAFL	Auckland
James Kusel	Hutt Valley Eagles	(New Zealand) WAFL	Wellington
Jay Johnson	Eastern Blues	(New Zealand) CAFL	Canterbury
Joe Baker-Thomas	St Kilda Saints	(Australia) AFL	Melbourne
Josh Cunliffe	North Shore Tigers	(New Zealand) AAFL	Auckland
Josh Mackie	Otago Hoops	(New Zealand) Otago AFL	Otago
Liam Beattie	University Blues	(New Zealand) AAFL	Auckland
Michael Boyce	Mt Roskill Saints	(New Zealand) AAFL	Auckland
Misilifi Faimalo	North City Demons	(New Zealand) WAFL	Wellington
Peter Halstead	Eastern Bulldogs	(New Zealand) WAFL	Wellington
Samuel McKenzie	Mt Roskill Saints	(New Zealand) AAFL	Auckland
Shane Leat	Waitakere Magpies	(New Zealand) AAFL	Auckland
Te Kopa Tipene-Thomas	North Shore Tigers	(New Zealand) AAFL	Auckland
Ty Smith	North Shore Tigers	(New Zealand) AAFL	Auckland
William Dickinson	Mt Roskill Saints	(New Zealand) AAFL	Auckland
William Gregson	Sandringham Zebras	(Australia) VFL	Melbourne

=== 2014 International Cup squad ===
Coach: Justin Davies

Captain: Andrew Howison

Joe Baker-Thomas (Wellington); Dan Benny (Otago); Michael Boyce (Auckland); Andy Christensen (Wellington); Brendan Clark (Queensland); Justin Clark (Canterbury); Jared Court (Canterbury); Nick Fisher (Canterbury); Michael Gregson (Auckland); Will Gregson (Auckland); Aaron Harris (Auckland); Andrew Howison (Canterbury); Levi Inglis (Canterbury); Jay Johnson (Canterbury); Cam Lubransky (Canterbury); Shane Leat (Auckland); Sam McKenzie (Wellington); Ben Miller (Otago); Tim Morton (Auckland); Chris Mundell (Auckland); David Rattenbury (Auckland); James Roughan (Auckland); Adam Simpson (Auckland); Kyle Smith (Canterbury); Ty Smith (Auckland); Te Kopa Tipene-Thomas (Northland); Logan Toomer (Otago); Matthew Van Wijk (Waikato)

=== 2011 International Cup squad ===
Coach: Justin Davies

Captain: Andrew Crighton

Vandyn Hartman (Manurewa Raiders); Samiuela Tuitupou (Manurewa Raiders); Rhys Panui-Leth (North Shore Tigers); Simon Carden (Mid Ashburton Eagles); Chris Mundell (University Blues); Charlton Brown (Manurewa Raiders); Sam Dickson (Eastern Blues); Stanley Chung (Eastern Bulldogs); Steven Howard (Mid Ashburton Eagles); David Rattenbury (Waitakere Magpies); David Cory Toussaint (University Blues); Adam Rice (North Shore Tigers); Michael Tagg (Mt Roskill Saints); Andrew Crighton (North Shore Tigers); Andrui Sucu (North Shore Tigers); Daniel McGregor (Waitakere Magpies); Troy Lavery (Hutt Valley Eagles); Aaron Harris (Waitakere Magpies); Luke Kneebone (Hamilton Mavericks); Justin Clark (University Cougars); Richard Bradley (Eastern Blues); Andrew Christensen (University Blues); Matthew Van Wijk (Manunda Hawks); Andrew Marsden (Waitakere Magpies); Andrew Howison (Mid Ashburton Eagles); Lukas Swart (Eastern Blues); Brendan Clark (Pambula Panthers); Michael Gregson (Waitakere Magpies); Jared Court (Eastern Blues)

=== 2008 International Cup squad ===
Coach: Justin Gauci and Justin Davies

Captain: Andrew Congalton

Mitchell Mace (Hamilton Tuis); Liam Ackland (Mt Roskill Saints); Scott McNally (Old Melburnians); Michael Boyce (Mt Roskill Saints); James Monaghan (University Blues); Geoffrey Thomas (VC)(Eastern Blues); Morgan Jones (VC) (University); Paul Gunning (Warnbro Swans); Andrew Congalton (C) (Takapuna Eagles); Marcus Jones (Mt Roskill Saints); James Bowden(Eastern Blues); John Maling (Waitakere Magpies); Lewis Hurst (Mt Roskill Saints); Andrew Buckthought (University Blues; David Rattenbury (Waitakere Magpies); David Cory-Toussaint (University Blues); Richie Marsden (Eastern Blues); Andrew Crighton (North Shore Tigers); Andriu Sucu (North Shore Tigers); Nic Cunneen (North Shore Tigers); Matthew Callaghan (Thornlie Lions); Luke Kneebone (Hamilton Mavericks; Richard Bradley (Eastern Blues); Sam Whitehead (Ashburton Eagles); Matthew Van Wijk (Hamilton Mavericks); Graham Rattenbury (Eastern Bulldogs); Shane Browne (Eastern Blues); Matt Crighton (North Shore Tigers); Aaron Harris (University Cougars); Jared Court (Eastern Blues); Moss Doran (Sth Warrnambool Roosters)

=== 2005 International Cup squad (premiers) ===
Coach: Jim Lucy

Captain: Andrew Congalton

Tristan (McArley (North Shore Tigers); Caleb Stick (North Shore Tigers); Scott McNally (Eastern Blues); Jason Everson (Eastern Blues); Jason Pocock (VC) (North Shore Tigers); Geoff Thomas (VC) (Eastern Blues); John Mailing (Waitakere Magpies); Paul Gunning (Manurewa Raiders); Andrew Congalton (Takapuna Eagles); Marcus Jones (Mt Roskill Saints); James Bowden (Eastern Blues); Dougal Henderson (Waikato Thunder); Todd Danks (North Shore Tigers); Bevan Morris (Waikato Thunder); Craig Ashton (Takapuna Eagles); Paul Mason (Saints); David Cory-Toussaint (University Blues); Shaun Allison (University Cougars; Tim Stevens (Wellington); Steve Frogatt (University Blues); Byron Roff (Eastern Bulldogs); Louis McLennan (North Shore Tigers); Matt Callaghan (Mt Roskill Saints); Ryan Spooneer (Waikato Thunder); Shane Wahl (Wellington); Richard Bradley (Eastern Blues); Guy Ferguson (Eastern Bulldogs); Alex Fakatoumafia (Manurewa Raiders); Andrew Marsden (Waitakere Magpies); Nathan Rose (Eagles); Anthony James (Eagles); Alban Beaumont (Eastern Blues)

=== 2002 International Cup squad ===
Coach: Andrew Cadozow

Captain: John Jackson

John Jackson (C) (Eastern Suburbs Bulldogs); Aaron Saunders (Northern Jets); Al Hunter (Eastern Suburbs Bulldogs); Brad Doust (Eastern Blues); Bruce Malcom (North City Demons); Byron Roff (Eastern Suburbs Bulldogs); Craig Douthat (Takapuna Eagles); Dan Garbett (Eastern Suburbs Bulldogs); Dave Goodall (University Blues); Geoff Thomas (Eastern Blues); Grant Conway (North Shore Tigers); James Bowden (Eastern Blues); James Kerse (North City Demons); Jarad Evens (University Blues); Jason Ball (Eastern Blues); Josh Hema (Eastern Suburbs Bulldogs); Kerry Wilkinson (Mt Roskill Saints); Luke Ellis (North City Demons); Mike Gawn (Waitakere Magpies); Mike Severinsen (Eastern Suburbs Bulldogs); Miles Stratford (North Shore Tigers); Paul Gunning (Manurewa Raiders); Richard Bradley (Eastern Blues); Richard Pidgeon (University Blues); Rob Hart (Manurewa Raiders); Rob Willis (North City Demons); Steve Froggatt (University Blues); Tim Stevens (Wellington City Saints); Vince Serci (Eastern Suburbs Bulldogs); Wayne Harvey (Eastern Suburbs Bulldogs)

=== 1908 Melbourne Carnival squad ===
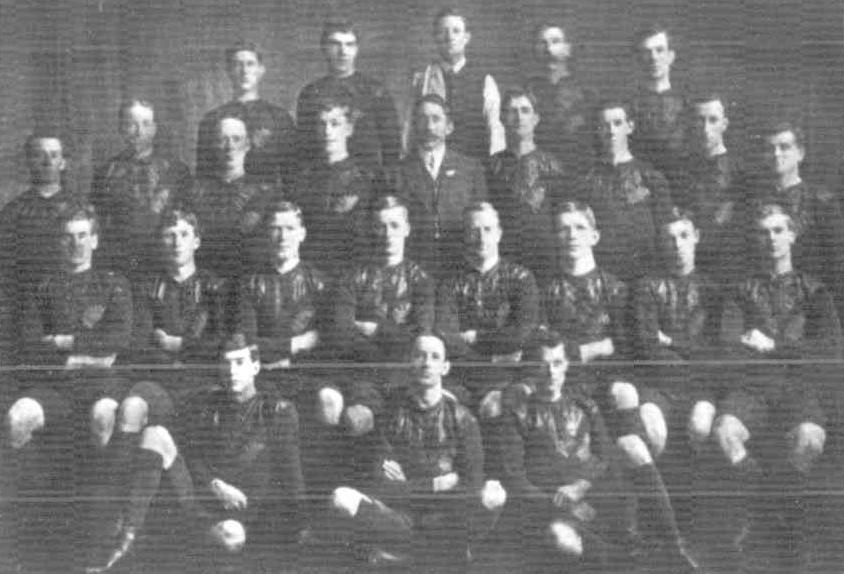
1908 squad

Team was selected by the NZAFL from the best players across the country's leagues, rather than by nationality.

New Zealand hired successful Collingwood Football Club coach Dick Condon for the carnival.

E. George, F.A. Lording, W. Monteith, J.G. Marshall, Tongue, H. Fletcher, J.J. Abfalter (Auckland), P.H. Elvidge, S.G. Darby, A. Swann (Waihi), M. Bonas, D. Patrick, E. Furness, A. McGrath, L.L. Paull (Wellington), George Dempster, H.L. West, T.J. "Tom" Wright (captain), H. Wilkinson, A. Porter, A. Fisher, Paisley, F. Ross (Christchurch), with emergencies, Burns, Welch, and L.A. Breese from Auckland, and Grant, and T. Smith.

== Alumni ==
Player	Level (years played)	Notable for
Mykelti Lefau	Open (2017, 2018, 2019)	Richmond (VFL, AFL), Melbourne Storm (U18)
Simon Black	Open (2017, 2018)	Brisbane Lions (AFL) Brownlow medallist and triple premiership player
William Warbrick	U18 (2016), Open (2016)	All Blacks Sevens Olympian, Melbourne Storm (NRL)
Cameron Illet	Open (2014, 2019)	NT Thunder captain, NTFL 8 time premiership player, 2 Nichols medals
Shem Tatupu	U16 (2009, 2010), Open (2012, 2013, 2018)	Hawthorn (AFL), Melbourne Storm (rookie)
Wayne Schwass	Open (2012c)	Sydney (AFL), North Melbourne (AFL) premiership player
Kurt Heatherley	U16 (2011, 2012), Open (2014)	Hawthorn (AFL), Rugby Union
Sam Dickson	Open (2010, 2011)	All Blacks Sevens
Matt Duffie	U16 (2007)	All Black (Rugby Union), Kiwi (Rugby League), Melbourne Storm (NRL)
Shaun Johnson	U16 (2006)	Kiwi (Rugby League), New Zealand Warriors (NRL)
Jason Woodward	U16 (2006)	NZ U20 (Rugby Union)
Nick Evans	U21 (2000)	All Black (Rugby Union)
Dion Nash	U21	New Zealand national cricket team
George A. Gillett	Open (1908)	All Black (Rugby Union), Kiwi (Rugby League), Western Australia (Australian rules)

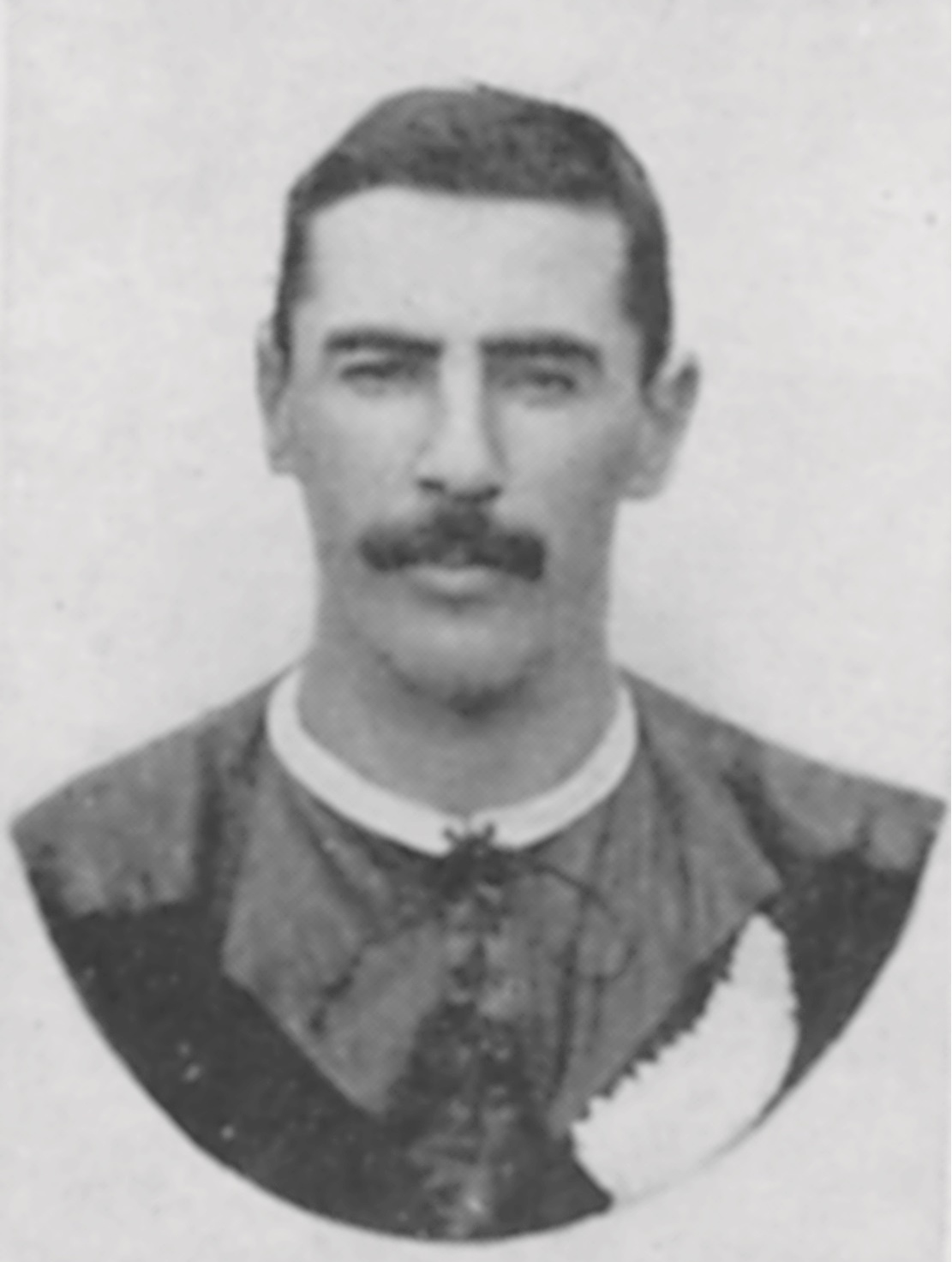
George A. Gillett part of the 1908 carnival team was also an All Black (Rugby Union) and then Kiwi (Rugby League) attributed his kicking game to Australian rules

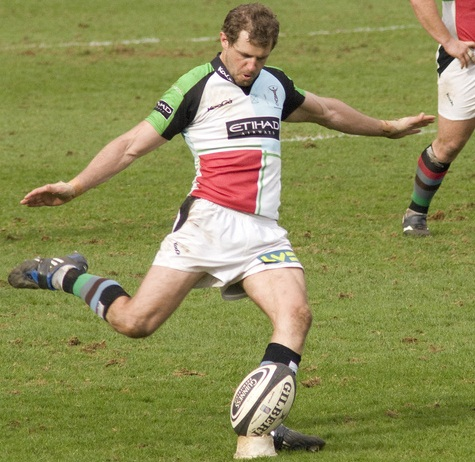
Nick Evans, All Black was a member of New Zealand's Under 20s, says Aussie Rules improved his kicking

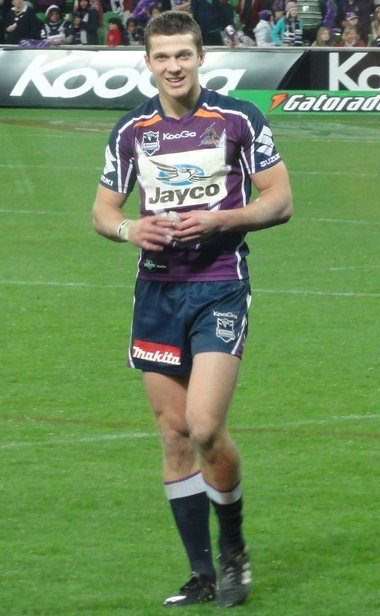
Matt Duffie dual rugby code international's kicking game is credited to his time in Aussie Rules

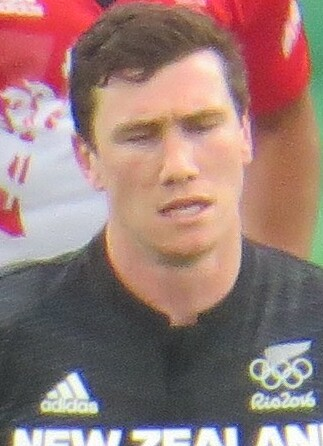
Sam Dickson, part of the 2010-2011 side credits his Olympic Rugby 7s success to the skills and fitness gained during his time in Aussie Rules

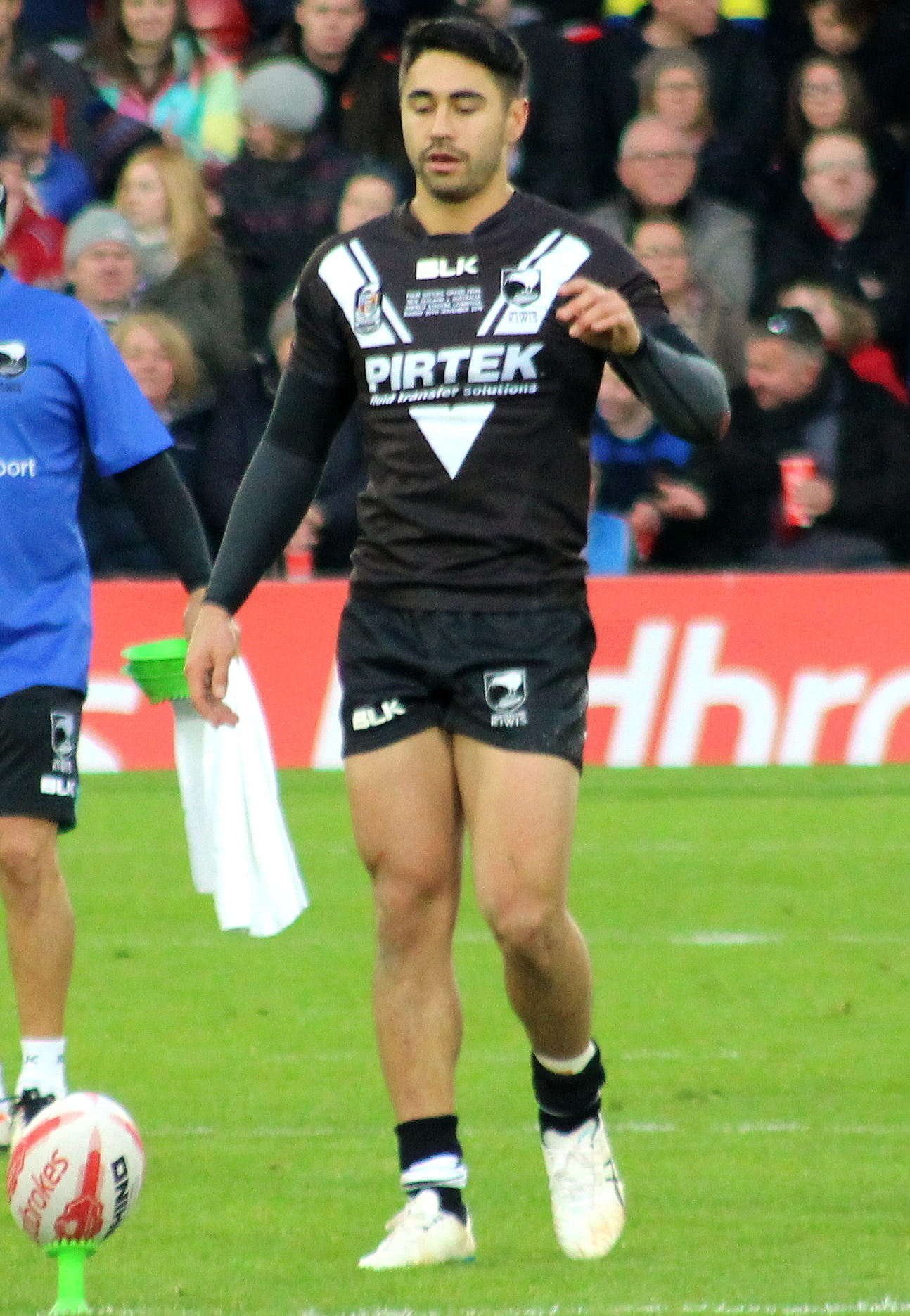
Shaun Johnson Rugby League Kiwi was a member of New Zealand's Under 16s side, his kicking skills have been attributed to his time in Aussie Rules

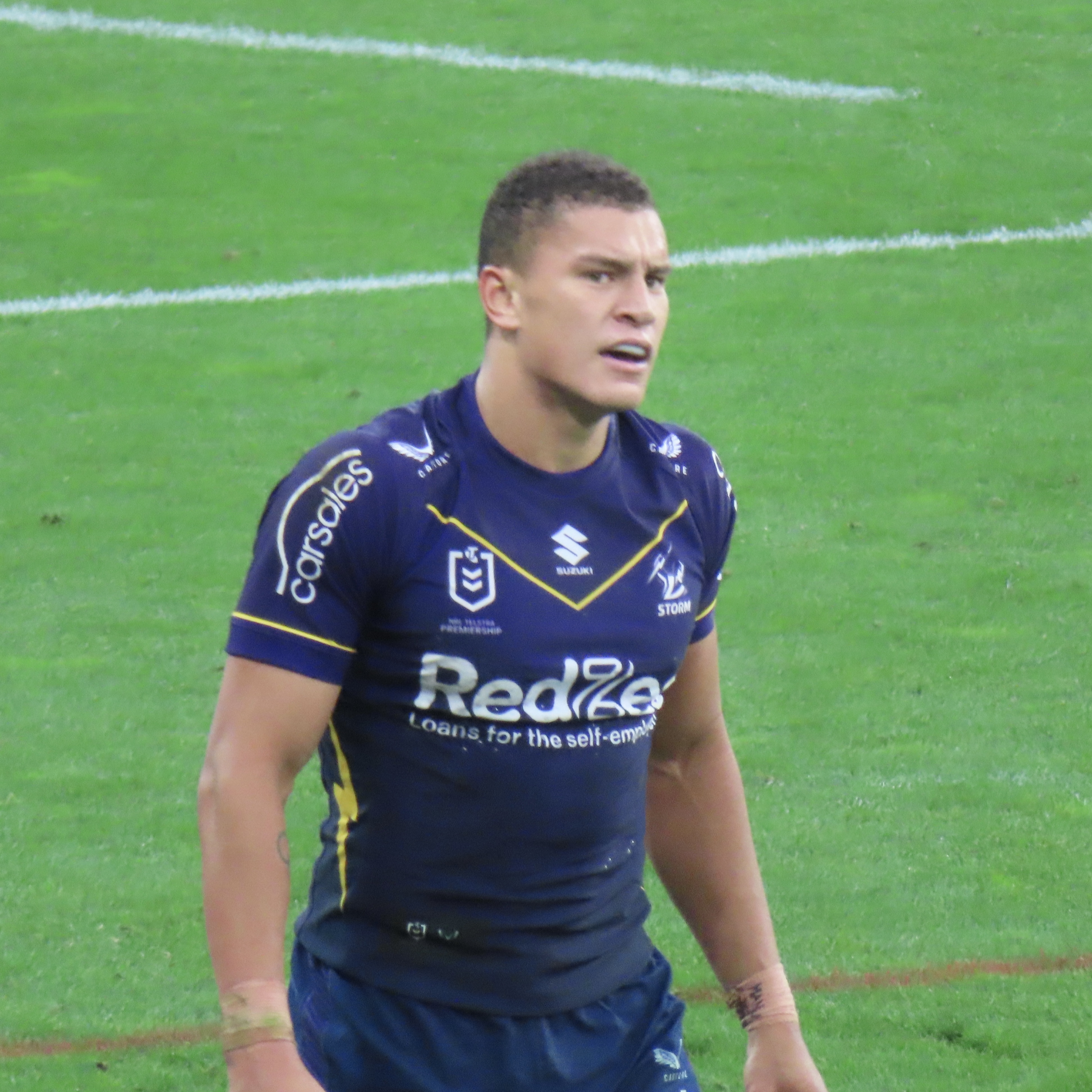
William Warbrick playing for the Melbourne Storm was a member of AFL New Zealand's 2016 team. His aerial ability to catch the high ball have been attribed to his time in Aussie Rules.

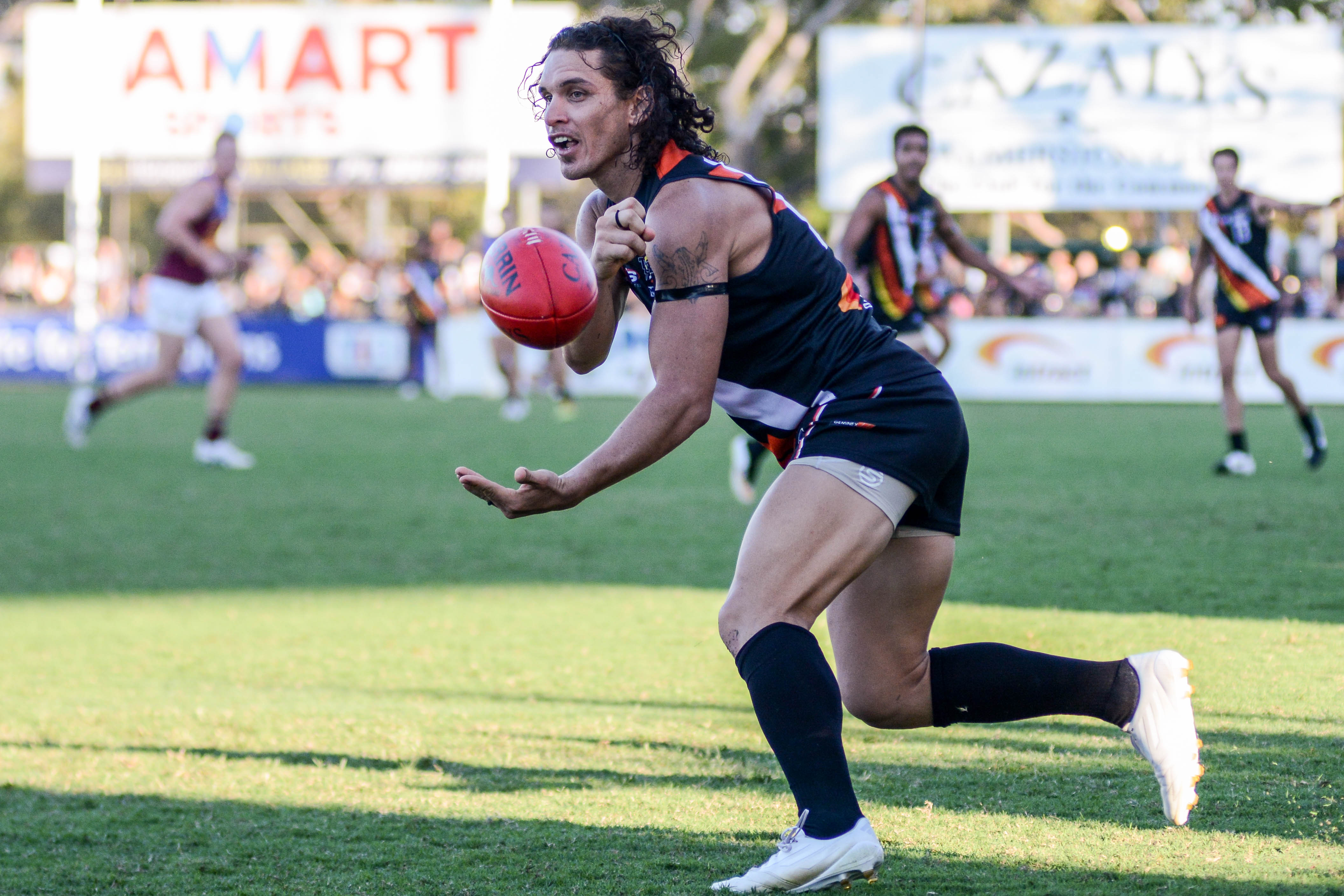
Cameron Ilett regarded as one of the greatest players in NTFL history with 8 premierships and 2 Nichols medals

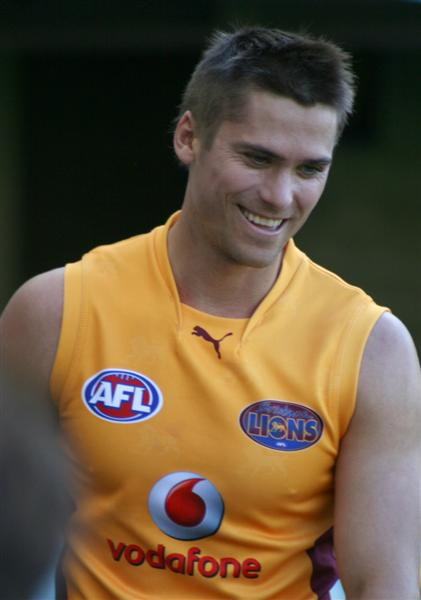
Simon Black former AFL Brownlow medallist and triple premiership player was given special permission to represent New Zealand in 2017 and 2018 due to his heritage.

== Books ==
1. de Moore, Greg; Hess, Rob; Nicholson, Matthew; Stewart, Bob (2021). Australia's Game: The History of Australian Football. Hardie Grant Books. ISBN 9781-74379-657-3.
