= List of Australian rules football clubs by date of establishment =

Barwon Heads 1922

This is a chronological list of Australian rules football clubs since their formation.

Note that some of these football clubs that formed before 1866 (see Laws of Australian football) may not have originally played the game known today as Australian rules football. It is more than likely that most of these clubs were influenced by the Melbourne Rules of 1859 which were the dominant rules of the day. However many played by their own rules and often compromised rules when playing against other clubs.

== Football clubs by date of establishment ==
Founding Date	Original name	Location	State	Country	Current competition	Notes & References
1858 April	St Kilda FC^{†}	St Kilda (Melbourne)	Victoria	(Australia)	Defunct	The club was formed in April 1858, playing under its own rules (possibly rugby). First recorded game was on 28 May 1859 against Melbourne University. Played at Alpaca Park until council bailiff did not allow them in 1865. Money from the club went to the cricket club. Most players went to South Yarra; others may have formed the bowls club. In 1872, when a home ground was found, the club started again with players returning from South Yarra. Important note: not related to the current St Kilda Football Club.
1858 July 10	Melbourne FC	Melbourne	Victoria	(Australia)	Australian Football League	Officially incorporated in 1859, its origins can be traced to an informal playing team prior to a prominent July 1858 letter in which Tom Wills calls for the formation of a "foot-ball club" with the need of a "code of laws".
1858 August 7	Church of England Grammar School FC	Melbourne	Victoria	(Australia)	APS Schools Football	Contest the annual Cordner–Eggleston Cup against Scotch College
1858 August 7	Scotch College FC	Melbourne	Victoria	(Australia)	APS Schools Football	Contest the annual Cordner–Eggleston Cup against Melbourne Grammar
1858 September 25	South Yarra FC^{†}	South Yarra (Melbourne)	Victoria	(Australia)	Defunct (1873)	Formed to play under its own rules (unknown – likely rugby football). Played it first game against Melbourne on 25 September 1858. Was joined by players of St Kilda in 1865. Merged with the St Kilda Cricketers' Club in 1873 to form the present-day St Kilda Football Club.
1859 May 28	Melbourne University FC	Parkville (Melbourne)	Victoria	(Australia)	VAFA	First recorded game was on 28 May 1859 against the original St Kilda Football Club. Disbanded for some time after World War I, leaving the VFL, then reformed with multiple teams in the VAFA.
1859 June 15	Castlemaine FC*	Castlemaine	Victoria	(Australia)	Bendigo Football League	Possibly dormant for periods.
1859 (9 June)	Brighton FC^{†}	Brighton (Melbourne)	Victoria	(Australia)	Defunct (unknown)	Considered unlikely to be connected to the Brighton Football Club (1885–1964)
1859 (Prior to 25 June)	Coast FC^{†}	Elsternwick (Melbourne)	Victoria	(Australia)	Defunct (1877)	Date of formation unknown
1859 July 18	Geelong FC	Geelong	Victoria	(Australia)	Australian Football League	Formed under its own rules. Began to adopt Melbourne rules in early 1860s. One of the founding members of both the VFA and VFL.
1859 (Prior to August)	Prahran FC^{†}	Prahran (Melbourne)	Victoria	(Australia)	Defunct (unknown)	Date of formation unknown Merged with St Kilda Football Club in 1888.
1859 (Prior to August)	Emerald Hill FC^{†}	Emerald Hill (Melbourne)	Victoria	(Australia)	Defunct (unknown)	Date of formation unknown
1860 April 25	Richmond FC^{†}	Richmond (Melbourne)	Victoria	(Australia)	Defunct (1861)	Formed at the Royal Hotel in Melbourne on 25 April 1860. Not related to the Richmond Football Club that formed in 1885 and participates in the Australian Football League. Club dissolved in 1861.
1860 April 26	Old Adelaide FC^{†}	Adelaide	South Australia	(Australia)	Defunct (1881)	Formed to play under its own rules. Staged games in the Adelaide North Parklands between sides selected from North and South of the River Torrens. Disbanded 1873 and reformed in 1875 after adopting the Victorian Rules. Founding member of SAFA in 1877. Merged with Kensington and disbanded after 5 games in SAFA 1881. Not to be confused with another SAFA Club called Adelaide which joined in 1885 or the present Adelaide Football Club in the AFL .
1860 May 18	Williamstown FC	Williamstown (Melbourne)	Victoria	(Australia)	Unknown	Very strong likelihood that this is the same as the current VFL club (Williamstown Football Club) though there is conflicting evidence. Was involved in the drafting of the 1860 rules.
1860 May 19	Collingwood FC	Collingwood (Melbourne)	Victoria	(Australia)	Defunct (?)	No connection to AFL club. Was involved in the drafting of the 1860 rules.
1860 May 20	Ballarat FC	Ballarat	Victoria	(Australia)	Ballarat Football League	Established as junior club. Senior club established in 1862.
1860 June 16	Boroondara FC^{†}	Boroondara (Melbourne)	Victoria	(Australia)	Defunct (1860)	Began with scratch matches, was involved in the 1860 rules committee however disappeared later that year.
1861 May 28	Warrnambool FC	Warrnambool	Victoria	(Australia)	Hampden FNL	On 28 May 1861, the Warrnambool Examiner published an advertisement of a "foot-ball" game.
1861	Federal FC	Wagga Wagga	New South Wales	(Australia)	Riverina Football Netball League	
1861 June 3	Sandhurst FC	Bendigo	Victoria	(Australia)	Bendigo Football League	Alleged to have been founded by J.B. Thompson, one of the inventors of Australian rules football.
1862 May 7	Essendon and Flemington FC	Flemington (Melbourne)	Victoria	(Australia)	Defunct (?)	No connection to AFL club
1862 May 12	Royal Park FC	Brunswick (Melbourne)	Victoria	(Australia)	Defunct (?)	
1862 July 24	Modbury FC and Teatree Gully	Adelaide	South Australia	(Australia)	South Australian Amateur Football League	Accepted an invitation to play the Old Adelaide Football Club on 24 July 1862. Later split into two clubs being the current Modbury Football Club and Tea Tree Gully Football Club.
1862	Williamstown FC^{†}	Williamstown (Melbourne)	Victoria	(Australia)	Defunct	The first of two Williamstown clubs
1862	Bendigo FC^{†}	Bendigo	Victoria	(Australia)	Defunct	Earliest records of matches are from 1862
1862	Kangaroo Flat FC^{†}	Bendigo	Victoria	(Australia)	Defunct	Earliest records of matches are from 1862. Joined the Bendigo Junior Football association in 1866. Current senior club formed in 1890.
1864	Campbells Creek FC	Campbells Creek	Victoria	(Australia)	Maryborough Castlemaine District Football Netball League	
1864	Williamstown FC	Williamstown (Melbourne)	Victoria	(Australia)	Victorian Football League	May have been founded as early as 1860, though possible connection with earlier club remains unproven.
1864 July	Carlton FC	Carlton (Melbourne)	Victoria	(Australia)	Australian Football League	Founding member of the VFA and VFL.
1864	New Town FC^{†}	Hobart	Tasmania	(Australia)	Defunct	Unlikely to have played under Victorian Rules
1865 June 17	Sydney FC^{†}	Sydney	New South Wales	(Australia)	Australian Football League	First club in Sydney formed under its own rules (possibly Victorian), formally adopted the Victorian Rules in 1866 but survived only briefly.
1865	Australian FC^{†}	Sydney	New South Wales	(Australia)	Defunct (1868?)	Likely to have played under its own rules however formally adopted Victorian rules in 1866 along with Sydney FC and played early matches against Sydney. Survived only briefly.
1865	Brunswick FC^{†}	Brunswick (Melbourne)	Victoria	(Australia)	Defunct (1991)	
1865 August 12	St Peter's College^{†}	Adelaide	South Australia	(Australia)	Defunct	St Peter's College Football Club founded in 1865. Played the Adelaide Educational Institute Football Club in 1865 under the Old Adelaide Football Club rules. The school was still fielding a football team in 1905? Under what club? An external St Peter's Old Collegians Football Club was established in 1928.
1865 August 12	Adelaide Educational Institute^{†}	Adelaide	South Australia	(Australia)	Defunct (1880)	Played the St Peter's Collegiate Football Club in 1865 under the Old Adelaide Football Club rules. Adelaide Educational Institute closed in 1880.
1865	Penola	Penola	South Australia	(Australia)	Kowree Naracoorte Tatiara Football League	Claims that the club was founded in 1865. Meeting held on 25 July 1868. Confirmed to have been challenged by the Mount Gambier Football Club in 1869.
1866 April 18	Kapunda	Kapunda	South Australia	(Australia)	Barossa Light & Gawler Football Association	Formed by Kapunda copper miners on 18 April 1866 in the North Kapunda Hotel.
1866 May 12	Hobart Town^{†}	Hobart	Tasmania	(Australia)	Defunct	Did not play Victorian/Australian rules Its formation is frequently erroneously suggested as evidence of the game's early establishment in the colony.
1866 May 22	Brisbane^{†}	Brisbane	Queensland	(Australia)	Defunct (1887c)	Formed under Victorian rules. Club disbanded at the end of the 1887 season. Switched to soccer in 1870 then back to Australian rules and switched to rugby in 1879 and back to Australian rules again before disappearing around 1887–88. No connection to Brisbane Bears or Brisbane Lions
1867 April	Albert Park FC^{†}	Melbourne	Victoria	(Australia)	Defunct (1880)	Renamed South Melbourne Football Club, Emerald-hill then Albert-park. Merged with South Melbourne (Sydney Swans) in 1880
1867 August 31	Mount Gambier^{†}	Mount Gambier	South Australia	(Australia)	Defunct (1897c)	Club formed in 1867 and adopted the rules of Australian rules football The club dissolved around 1897.
1867	Newington College FC	Silverwater (Western Sydney)	New South Wales	(Australia)	Independent School's Competition	Australian rules football was introduced in 1867 by its then headmaster and ex-Geelong FC vice-president George Metcalfe. It was the first school club in Sydney formed to play under Victorian Rules. It switched to rugby in 1869. The school reintroduced the sport in 2016.
1868 May 23	Woodville^{†}	Adelaide	South Australia	(Australia)	Defunct (1877)	Formed as Port Suburban Football Club it renamed to Woodville in 1870. Dissolved at the end of the 1877 SAFA season with a number of the club's leading players, including the captain, forming the Norwood Football Club in 1878. Not affiliated with the club of the same name that formed in 1938.
1868 June 30	Gawler^{†}	Gawler	South Australia	(Australia)	Defunct (1890)	Amalgamated with Albion as Gawler Albion to join SAFA for 1887. Albion dropped from the name for the SAFA 1888 Season. Gawler Football Association (formed in 1889) withdrew the senior Gawler club from SAFA in 1891. Gawler Football Association representative teams would continue to represent Gawler in matches against clubs visiting the Township. Gawler Football Association merged with the Barossa & Light Football Association (formed in 1908) to form the Barossa Light & Gawler Football Association in 1987.
1868	Ipswich Grammar^{†}	Ipswich	Queensland	(Australia)	Defunct	Founded 1868 Switched to rugby in 1887. Participate in Queensland Independent Schools Australian Football League for some time in the 2000s
1868	Wharehousemen^{†}	Melbourne	Victoria	(Australia)	Defunct	
1868	Kyneton	Kyneton	Victoria	(Australia)	Bendigo Football League	
1869 May	Tradesmen^{†}	Mount Gambier	South Australia	(Australia)	Defunct	
1869 July 24	Creswick	Creswick	Victoria	(Australia)	Central Highlands Football League	First game against Kingston on 24 July 1869.
1869	North Melbourne FC	North Melbourne (Melbourne)	Victoria	(Australia)	Australian Football League	Officially founded in 1869.
1869	Carlton Imperial^{†}	Parkville (Melbourne)	Victoria	(Australia)	Defunct (1876)	Competed in the Unaffiliated era, but did not apply to enter the VFA for 1877 following a difficult season 1876 and folded. Most players joined Carlton and others moved to Hotham. The Imperials are sometimes mistakenly referred too as the Reserves side of Carlton, though the two were not affiliated and did not formally amalgamate.
1869	Northcote FC^{†}	Northcote (Melbourne)	Victoria	(Australia)	Defunct (1987)	
1870 May 11	Young Australian^{†}	Adelaide	South Australia	(Australia)	Defunct (1872)	Founded at the Royal Oak Hotel in Adelaide on 11 May 1870. 1871 – Renamed to Union Cricket and Football Club
1870 May 12	Port Adelaide	Adelaide	South Australia	(Australia)	Australian Football League	Fielding teams in the SANFL since foundation and in the AFL since 1997. Only pre-existing non-Victorian club to be competing in the Australian Football League.
1870	Brisbane Grammar^{†}	Brisbane	Queensland	(Australia)	Defunct	Switched to rugby in 1885. New junior club established in 2005 to participate in Queensland Independent Schools Australian Football League
1870 May	Ipswich^{†}	Ipswich	Queensland	(Australia)	Defunct	Dormant in the 1890s, then reformed in 1906 lasted until the 1940s after which it either folded or became a soccer club
1870	Volunteer Artillery^{†}	Brisbane	Queensland	(Australia)	Defunct	Appears to have begun as an 11-man soccer club before later (possibly late 1860s) switching between codes to facilitate matches against Brisbane Football Club which was the only available opposition. Breakaway from Brisbane FC. There are no records of its incorporation.
1870	Civil Service^{†}	Brisbane	Queensland	(Australia)	Defunct	Members of Brisbane FC participated in scratch matches. Breakaway from Brisbane FC. There are no records of its incorporation.
1871	Railway Workshops^{†}	Ipswich	Queensland	(Australia)	Defunct	
1871 April 24	Alberton and Queenstown^{†}	Port Adelaide	South Australia	(Australia)	Defunct	Formed by the Alberton and Queenstown Cricket Club. Home ground Port Gasworks, Kingston-on-the-Hill. Appears to be defunct after just one season.
1871	Kensington^{†}	Adelaide	South Australia	(Australia)	Defunct (1886)	Integral club to the codification of Australian rules in South Australia. SAFA 1877–1881; Adelaide and Suburban Association 1882–1885
1871	Ararat*	Ararat	Victoria	(Australia)	Wimmera Football League	
1871	Redan	Redan	Victoria	(Australia)	Ballarat Football League	
1872	Lilydale	Lilydale	Victoria	(Australia)	1st Div Eastern Football League	Formerly Yarra Valley Football League, Mountain District Football League, Eastern Districts Football League
1872, 26 April	Kent Terrace^{†}	Adelaide	South Australia	(Australia)	Defunct	
1872	Essendon	Melbourne	Victoria	(Australia)	Australian Football League	Founding member of the VFL.
1872	Maryborough	Maryborough	Victoria	(Australia)	Bendigo Football League	
1873	Maldon	Maldon	Victoria	(Australia)	Maryborough -Castlemaine District Football League	
1873 May 21	Rockhampton^{†}	Rockhampton	Queensland	(Australia)	Defunct	Formed at Leichart Hotel to play under Victorian Rules
1873	Warwick^{†}	Warwick	Queensland	(Australia)	Defunct	Club existed after 24 May 1873 and practiced, however had no opposition, appears to have gone dormant and reformed in 1875 there are no mention of matches against other clubs until the introduction of nearby Toowoomba in 1876.
1873 April 2	St Kilda	Melbourne	Victoria	(Australia)	Australian Football League	Founding member of the VFA and VFL.
1873	Hawthorn^{†}	Melbourne	Victoria	(Australia)	Defunct	The continuity of clubs with this name is disputed. The existing Hawthorn Football Club is purported to have formed in 1901.
1873	Port District	Adelaide	South Australia	(Australia)	SAAFL	Founded as the LeFevre Peninsula Football Club in 1873. Later renamed Semaphore Central in 1898. In 1979 absorbed the Exeter Football Club and renamed as the Port District Football Club.
1873 May	Victorian^{†}	Adelaide	South Australia	(Australia)	Defunct (1885)	Founding member of SAFA in 1877 and Joint Premiers. Renamed to the North Adelaide Football Club in 1883. Collected wooden spoons in final two seasons 1883 and 1884. Resigned from SAFA on eve of 1885 Season. It is not related to the present North Adelaide Football Club in SANFL.
1874 May 29	Willunga	Willunga	South Australia	(Australia)	Great Southern Football League	1877 foundation member of SAFA – which became SANFL.
1874 June 8	Rochester	Rochester	Victoria	(Australia)	Goulburn Valley Football League	Founded in 1874 so it could play against the Echuca Football Club
1874 June 19	Cecil	South Melbourne	Victoria	(Australia)	Australian Football League	Renamed South Melbourne four weeks after formation. Relocated to Sydney in 1982.
1874	Sandridge Alma^{†}	South Melbourne	Victoria	(Australia)	Defunct	Formed from the Alma Cricket Club
1874	Port Melbourne	Port Melbourne (Melbourne)	Victoria	(Australia)	Victorian Football League	
1874	Penshurst	Penshurst	Victoria	(Australia)	Mininera & District Football League	
1874	Echuca	Echuca	Victoria	(Australia)	Goulburn Valley Football League	
1875 May 3	South Adelaide	Adelaide	South Australia	(Australia)	Defunct	Held meeting at Arab Hotel, corner Gillies and Hutt Street, Adelaide. Played a game against the Kensington Club. Amalgamated with a breakaway group from the Old Adelaide Football Club in 1876 who also called themselves South Adelaide Football Club.
1875 May 22	Casterton	Casterton	Victoria	(Australia)	Western Border Football League	
1876 June 3	Albury	Albury	New South Wales	(Australia)	Ovens & Murray Football League	
1875 June	Wangaratta	Wangaratta	Victoria	(Australia)	Ovens & Murray Football League	
1875 July 16	Launceston	Launceston	Tasmania	(Australia)	Tasmanian Football League	
1876	Toowoomba^{†}	Toowoomba	Queensland	(Australia)	Defunct	
1876 April 12	South Adelaide	Adelaide	South Australia	(Australia)	South Australian National Football League	Formed by amalgamation after a 2nd breakaway group from the Old Adelaide Football Club who merged with a Club already called South Adelaide who had broken away in the previous year. First game of new club was on 20 May 1876.
1876	Australs ^{†}	Adelaide	South Australia	(Australia)	Defunct (1876)	Held meeting at Havelock Hotel, Adelaide on 13 May 1876. SA Interclub 1876
1876	Glenelg^{†}	Glenelg	South Australia	(Australia)	Defunct	Opening game held on 10 June 1876; SA Interclub 1876
1876	Ballarat Imperial^{†}	Ballarat	Victoria20	(Australia)	Defunct (1955)	
1876	Inglewood	Inglewood	Victoria	(Australia)	Loddon Valley Football League	
1876	Heidelberg	Melbourne	Victoria	(Australia)	Northern Football League	
1876	Winchelsea	Winchelsea	Victoria	(Australia)	Geelong & District Football League	
1876	Portland FNCC	Portland	Victoria	(Australia)	Hampden FNL	
1877 April 7	South Park^{†}	Adelaide	South Australia	(Australia)	Defunct (1884)	At the start of 1885 South Park disbanded, with a number of its better players transferring to South Adelaide.
1877 June 16	Wahgunyah	Wahgunyah	Victoria	(Australia)	Tallangatta & District Football League	
1877	Corowa^{†}	Corowa	New South Wales	(Australia)	Defunct (1979)	
1877	Britannia^{†}	Collingwood	Victoria	(Australia)	Defunct (1892)	Colours were blue, red and white. Played their first games in 1878. Played out of Victoria Park from 1882 and were a precursor to the Collingwood Football Club's formation in 1892.
1877	Camperdown	Camperdown	Victoria	(Australia)	Hampden FNL	
1877	Sale	Sale	Victoria	(Australia)	Gippsland Football League	
1877	Stratford	Stratford	Victoria	(Australia)	East Gippsland Football Netball League	The 'Stratty Swans' FC wear a red and white vertical stripe guernsey. EGFL premierships 3 and 3 premierships in the now defunct Riviera Football League.
1877 March 28	Bankers^{†}	Adelaide	South Australia	(Australia)	Defunct (1877)	Weak fledgling club that was a founding member of the SAFA. Folded midway during the inaugural season 1877 after struggling with playing numbers.
1877	Footscray	Melbourne	Victoria	(Australia)	Australian Football League	The club's name remains the Footscray Football Club Pty Ltd but now trades & is known as "Western Bulldogs". The letters FFC can still be located near the neck on the back of the jumpers identifying the clubs true name. In 1879 Prince Eugene Louis Napoleon, the 'Prince Imperial' and heir to the French throne, was ambushed and killed by Zulu warriors during the Anglo-Zulu war in Africa. Out of respect to him, the Footscray Football Club changed their name to the prince Imperials Football Club. In 1882 it decided to revert to the name 'Footscray' and therefore 1883 can not have been its formation date.
1877	Beechworth	Beechworth	Victoria	(Australia)	Tallangatta & District Football League	
1878	Clarendon FC^{†}	East Melbourne (Melbourne)	Victoria	(Australia)	Defunct (1882)	Renamed East Melbourne
1878 July 6	Wodonga	Wodonga	Victoria	(Australia)	Ovens & Murray Football League	
1878	Excelsior^{†}	Brisbane	Queensland	(Australia)	Defunct	Formed at the start of the season. Played its first match in August 1878
1878	Wallaroo^{†}	Brisbane	Queensland	(Australia)	Defunct	From 1880 interchanged between Australian rules and rugby
1878	Brunswick^{†}	Brisbane	Queensland	(Australia)	Defunct	
1878 Feb 28	Norwood	Adelaide	South Australia	(Australia)	South Australian National Football League	
1878	North Park^{†}	North Adelaide	South Australia	(Australia)	Defunct	Club formed in 1878. Premier Club from Adelaide and Suburban merged with Adelaide to form Adelaide SAFA (1885)
1878	West Melbourne^{†}	Melbourne	Victoria	(Australia)	Defunct	merged with North Melbourne Football Club
1878	New Norfolk District	New Norfolk	Tasmania	(Australia)	Southern Football League (Tasmania)	
1878	Toowoomba Grammar^{†}	Brisbane	Queensland	(Australia)	Defunct	Switched to rugby in 1887
1879 March 27	Reform^{†}	Wellington	New Zealand	(New Zealand)	Defunct	First known club to be established outside Australia
1879 May 14	Athenian^{†}	Ipswich	Queensland	(Australia)	Defunct (~1892)	Began as an Australian rules club in May 1879 however switched to rugby in 1889 starting with its juniors before fielding a full senior side in 1890 and breaking away from the QFA to the local rugby competition. It switched briefly back to Australian rules in 1892 hoping that an Ipswich competition would recommence however when this didn't eventuate it switched back to continuing on until the 1920s after which it switched into a rugby league in the West Moreton Rugby League until the 1940s after which it may have folded or renamed.
1879 July 10	Yatala	Salisbury	South Australia	(Australia)	Defunct	Maiden game vs Harris, Scarfe, & Co.'s employees.
1879 July 12	Angaston	Angaston	South Australia	(Australia)	Barossa Light & Gawler Football Association	
1878	St Killian^{†}	Brisbane	Queensland	(Australia)	Defunct	
1879	Sunbury	Sunbury	Victoria	(Australia)	Ballarat Football League	
1879	Melton	Melton, Victoria	Victoria	(Australia)	Ballarat Football League	
1879	Cobden	Cobden	Victoria	(Australia)	Hampden FNL	
1879	Aldinga	Aldinga	South Australia	(Australia)	Southern Football League	One of four teams that founded what is now known as the Southern Football League in 1879.
1879	College Park ^{†}	College Park	South Australia	(Australia)	Defunct	Competed in the City and Suburban Association which formed in 1891. Renamed East Torrens in 1897. 1898 competed in East Torrens Football Association.
1879	Hotham^{†}	North Adelaide	South Australia	(Australia)	Defunct 1889	Merged with Tritons in 1884. Premiers City and Suburban Association 1885 and 1886. Joined SAFA in 1887. Renamed North Adelaide in 1888. Merged with Adelaide in 1889.
1879	Middlesex ^{†}	City of Adelaide	South Australia	(Australia)	Defunct	Last reported games were in 1881.
1879	Gisborne	Gisborne	Victoria	(Australia)	Bendigo Football League	
1880 March 25	Royal Park^{†}	Adelaide	South Australia	(Australia)	Defunct 1882	Joined SAFA in 1882 and folded after 5 games.
1880 April 16	Glenelg ^{†}	Glenelg	South Australia	(Australia)	Defunct	Decided not to join proposed Junior Association
1880 May 1	Kent Town	Adelaide	South Australia	(Australia)	Defunct	Played first game in 1880. and was a member of the Adelaide and Suburban Football Association.
1880	Beaufort	Beaufort	Victoria	(Australia)	Central Highlands Football League	
1880	Eaglehawk	Eaglehawk	Victoria	(Australia)	Bendigo Football League	
1880	Macclesfield	Adelaide	South Australia	(Australia)	Hills Football League	
1880 August 7	Sydney^{†}	Sydney	New South Wales	(Australia)	Defunct (1926)	Formed in 1880 as the first Australian Rules club in Sydney, participating in the NSWAFA in 1881.
1880 August 7	East Sydney^{†}	Sydney	New South Wales	(Australia)	Defunct (1954)	In 1926, it merged with Paddington AFC to become the Eastern Suburbs AFC. This club again merged with the university club to become the Uni-NSW Eastern Suburbs Bulldogs AFC in 1999.
1881 April 30^{†}	Blackwood	Blackwood	Victoria	(Australia)	Defunct	
1881	Murchison	Murchison	Victoria	(Australia)	Kyabram District Football League	
1881	Canterbury FC	Canterbury	Victoria	(Australia)	VAFA	Canterbury was formed in 1881 and joined the newly created Reporter District Football Association (RDFA) in 1903. The club's first home ground was located at the back of the Canterbury Hotel, which was between Canterbury railway station and Wattle Valley Road.
1881	North Hobart	Hobart	Tasmania	(Australia)	Tasmanian Football League	
1881	North Adelaide	Adelaide	South Australia	(Australia)	South Australian National Football League	Originally known as the Medindie Football Club which joined the Adelaide and Suburban Association in 1886 and then SAFA in 1888. Renamed North Adelaide in 1893.
1881	Balmain^{†}	Balmain (Sydney)	New South Wales	(Australia)	Defunct (?)	
1881	Woollahra^{†}	Woollahra (Sydney)	New South Wales	(Australia)	Defunct (?)	
1882 April	Rovers^{†}	Perth	Western Australia	(Australia)	Defunct (1899)	Started as a rugby club but switched to Australian rules in 1885. Inaugural premiers of the WA competition in 1885 and again in 1891. Disbanded in 1899.
1882 April	Fremantle*^{†}	Fremantle	Western Australia	(Australia)	Defunct (1886)	No relation to the present-day club by the same name. Formed as a rugby club but switched to Australian rules in 1885. Disbanded at the end of 1886.
1882 July 15	Gympie^{†}	Gympie	Queensland	(Australia)	Defunct	
1882	Unions*^{†}	Fremantle	Western Australia	(Australia)	Defunct	Formed as a rugby club in 1882, Unions switched to Australian rules in 1885. Its remnants were eventually folded into South Fremantle.
1882	Ballarat	North Ballarat	Victoria	(Australia)	Ballarat Football League	
1882	Maffra	Maffra	Victoria	(Australia)	Gippsland Football League	
1882	Preston	Preston (Melbourne)	Victoria	(Australia)	Victorian Football League	Now Northern Bullants
1882	Maryborough^{†}	Maryborough	Queensland	(Australia)	Defunct	
1882	Emu^{†}	Maryborough	Queensland	(Australia)	Defunct	
1882	Rover^{†}	Brisbane	Queensland	(Australia)	Defunct	Started as Australian rules but switched to rugby and soccer
1882	Holbrook	Holbrook	New South Wales	(Australia)	Hume Football Netball League	
1883 July 10	One-Mile^{†}	Gympie	Queensland	(Australia)	Defunct	Formed to join the Wide-Bay Burnett Association and based on One-Mile park Gympie
1883	Creswick	Adelaide	South Australia	(Australia)	Defunct	First reported games in 1883. First Annual Dinner held in 1884. 1885 joined the South Australian Junior Football. 1886 Runnerup to Hotham in Adelaide and Suburban Association. Applied to join United Football Association (SAFA) in 1888 but continued in Adelaide and Suburban Association. Last reported games were in 1890 Season.
1883 September 26	Fitzroy	Melbourne	Victoria	(Australia)	VAFA	Playing operations merged with the Brisbane Bears in 1996, but the club continues to trade as standalone entity,
1883	Swans^{†}	Fremantle	Western Australia	(Australia)	Defunct	
1885 March 5	Adelaide ^{†}	North Adelaide	South Australia	(Australia)	Defunct (1894)	Formed from merger of North Adelaide Juniors and North Park from Adelaide and Suburban Association. SAFA Premiers 1886. 1893 Merged with Eastbourne Football Club from City and Suburban Association. Not to be confused with the present Adelaide Football Club in the AFL.
1885 March 26	East Torrens	Kent Town, South Australia	South Australia	(Australia)	Defunct	Formed from merger of Kent Town and Zingari. Later an East Torrens Football Association was formed. Which Kent Town was a member.
1885 June 9	Brighton FC^{†}	Brighton (Melbourne)	Victoria	(Australia)	Defunct (1964)	
1885	Union^{†}	Brisbane	Queensland	(Australia)	Defunct	
1885	North Rockhampton^{†}	Rockhampton	Queensland	(Australia)	Defunct	
1885	Day Dream	Silverton	New South Wales	(Australia)		
1885	Silverton	Silverton	New South Wales	(Australia)		
1885	Brighton^{†}	Adelaide	South Australia	(Australia)	Defunct (1938)	In 1938 Brighton amalgamated with the Seacliff Football Club to form the Brighton and Seacliff Football Club (BSFC). At the end of the 1990 season the BSFC merged with Brighton High Old Scholars to form the Brighton Bombers.
1885	Richmond	Melbourne	Victoria	(Australia)	Australian Football League	Joined the VFL in 1908.
1885	Victorians^{†}	Perth	Western Australia	(Australia)	Defunct (1890)	In 1889, the club merged with the West Australian Football Club and became Metropolitans. Metropolitans folded at the end of 1890.
1885	Rosewater	Adelaide	South Australia	(Australia)	South Australian Amateur Football League	
1886	Charters Towers^{†}	Charters Towers	Queensland	(Australia)	Defunct	
1886	Koroit	Koroit	Victoria	(Australia)	Hampden FNL	
1887 October 8	Kangaroo Point^{†}	Kangaroo Point	Queensland	(Australia)	Defunct	
1887	Kermandie^{†}	Geeveston	Tasmania	(Australia)	Defunct (2010)	
1887	Sydney University ANFC	Sydney	New South Wales	(Australia)	NEAFL	SUANFC claims to be a spin-off of Australia's oldest rugby union club, Sydney University Football Club founded in 1865, which experimented with Australian rules in its early years. If the claim is accepted, this would make SUANFC the oldest Australian rules football club in NSW. However it did not play an Australian rules fixture until 1887.
1887	Frankston	Frankston	Victoria	(Australia)	Victorian Football League	
1888	Mitcham	Mitcham	Victoria	Australia	Eastern Football Netball League	
1888	Healesville	Healesville	Victoria	(Australia)	Yarra Valley Mountain District Football League	
1889 March 19	Gawler Centrals	Gawler	South Australia	(Australia)	Barossa Light & Gawler Football Association	Founding member of Gawler Football Association renamed Gawler and Districts Football League in 1953
1889 March 21	South Gawler	Gawler South	South Australia	(Australia)	Barossa Light & Gawler Football Association	Founding member of Gawler Football Association renamed Gawler and Districts Football League in 1953
1889	Willaston	Willaston	South Australia	(Australia)	Barossa Light & Gawler Football Association	Founding member of Gawler Football Association renamed Gawler and Districts Football League in 1953
1889	Victoria^{†}	Maryborough	Queensland	(Australia)	Defunct	
1889	Eastbourne ^{†}	Adelaide	South Australia	(Australia)	Defunct	Premiers City Suburban Association 1891 and 1892. Merged with Adelaide (SAFA) in 1893. Rejoined City Suburban Association in 1894.
1889	Yankalilla	Yankalilla	South Australia	(Australia)	Great Southern Football Association	
1889	Cranbourne	Cranbourne	Victoria	(Australia)	Casey Cardinia Football League	
1890	Kangaroo Flat	Kangaroo Flat	Victoria	(Australia)	Bendigo Football League	
1891	Marion	Adelaide	South Australia	(Australia)	Adelaide Footy League	First formed in 1891 as the Sturt Football Club no relation to the SANFL's Sturt Football Club. Renamed in 1956 to Marion.
1891	Coburg	Coburg (Melbourne)	Victoria	(Australia)	Victorian Football League	
1891	Centrals^{†}	Perth	Western Australia	(Australia)	Defunct	
1891	West Perth	Perth	Western Australia	(Australia)	West Australian Football League	The oldest surviving football club in Western Australia, West Perth moved to the northern suburb of Joondalup in 1993 and has come under pressure to change its name to recognise its new location.
1891	Cheltenham	Cheltenham	Victoria	(Australia)	Southern Football Netball League	
1892 February 12	Collingwood	Melbourne	Victoria	(Australia)	Australian Football League	A meeting was held at the Collingwood town hall on Friday 12 February 1892 to announce the foundation of the Collingwood Football Club.
1892	Bunbury	Bunbury	Western Australia	(Australia)	South West Football League	Known as "Bunbury Railways Football Club" from 1906 until 1956.
1892	Imperials^{†}	Perth	Western Australia	(Australia)	Defunct	
1892	Corryong FNC*	Corryong	Victoria	(Australia)	Upper Murray Football Netball League	
1892	Cudgewa FNC*	Cudgewa	Victoria	(Australia)	Upper Murray Football Netball League	
1892	Federal FNC*	Corryong	Victoria	(Australia)	Upper Murray Football Netball League	Founded as the "Mount Elliot Football Club" in 1892 before being renamed to "Federal Football Club" in 1901.
1892	West Adelaide	Adelaide	South Australia	(Australia)	SANFL	The club joined the Adelaide and Suburban Association in 1894 and won the premierships in 1895 and 1896. Admitted to SAFA in 1897 with the introduction of Electoral District zoning.
1893	Port Natives^{†}	Port Adelaide	South Australia	(Australia)	Defunct	Held AGM on 25 Apr 1893 and decided that the club should join the Adelaide and Suburban Association and were Premiers in 1893 and 1894. Admitted to SAFA in 1895 as Natives and renamed to West Torrens in 1897.
1893	South Bendigo	South Bendigo	Victoria	(Australia)	Bendigo Football League	
1893	Sebastopol	Sebastopol	Victoria	(Australia)	Ballarat Football League	
1895	Culcairn	Culcairn	New South Wales	(Australia)	Hume Football Netball League	
1895	Henty	Henty	New South Wales	(Australia)	Hume Football Netball League	
1895	West Torrens	Thebarton	South Australia	(Australia)	South Australian National Football League	Originally formed as Natives and renamed to West Torrens with the introduction of Electoral District zoning in 1897. Merged with neighbouring Woodville club at end of 1990.
1896	Wanderers^{†}	Johannesburg	South Africa	(South Africa)	Defunct	Date of formation unknown
1896	Subiaco	Perth	Western Australia	(Australia)	West Australian Football League	
1897	South Bunbury	Bunbury	Western Australia	(Australia)	SWFL	South West Football League
1897	Midland	Mildand	Western Australia	(Australia)	Metro Football League	
1895	Howlong	Howlong	New South Wales	(Australia)	Hume Football Netball League	
1895	Jindera	Jindera	New South Wales	(Australia)	Hume Football Netball League	
1895	Lockhart	Lockhart	New South Wales	(Australia)	Hume Football Netball League	
1895	Osborne	Osborne	New South Wales	(Australia)	Hume Football Netball League	
1898	East Fremantle*	Fremantle	Western Australia	(Australia)	West Australian Football League	
1898	Kelmscott*	Kelmscott	Western Australia	(Australia)	South Suburban Murry Football League	
1899	North Broken Hill	Broken Hill	New South Wales	(Australia)	Broken Hill Football League	
1899	Perth	Perth	Western Australia	(Australia)	West Australian Football League	
1900 29 March	Gawler Shamrocks^{†}	Gawler	South Australia	(Australia)	Defunct 1903	Participated in Gawler Football Association. The colours decided upon were blue stockings, knickers, and guernseys, with green hoop. April 1903 letter sent to GFA informing club had disbanded.
1900 April 20	South Fremantle	Fremantle	Western Australia	(Australia)	West Australian Football League	
1900	Durban^{†}	Durban	South Africa	(South Africa)	Defunct (1909)	Date of formation unknown
1900	South Broken Hill	Broken Hill	New South Wales	(Australia)	Broken Hill Football League	
1901	Sturt	Adelaide	South Australia	(Australia)	South Australian National Football League	Formed by the Sturt Cricket Club
1901	Kangarilla	Adelaide	South Australia	(Australia)	Hills Football League	
1901	Walkerville	Adelaide	South Australia	(Australia)	South Australian Amateur Football League	
1901	Hawthorn	Melbourne	Victoria	(Australia)	Australian Football League	
1901	Spring Vale	Springvale (Melbourne)	Victoria	(Australia)	Victorian football league	Now Casey Demons
1902	Kalkee	Kalkee	Victoria	(Australia)	Horsham & District Football League	
1903	Echunga	Adelaide	South Australia	(Australia)	Hills Football League	
1903	Balaklava	Balaklava	South Australia	(Australia)	Adelaide Plains Football League	
1907	Gerogery	Gerogery	New South Wales	(Australia)	Defunct (1949)	
1903 February 25	North Shore	Sydney	New South Wales	(Australia)	Sydney Australian Football League	
1903	Balmain	Sydney	New South Wales	(Australia)	Sydney Australian Football League	
1903	Newtown	Sydney	New South Wales	(Australia)	Defunct (1987)	
1903	Lefroy^{†}	Wellington	New Zealand	(New Zealand)	Defunct	Renamed City
1903	Federal^{†}	Wellington	New Zealand	(New Zealand)	Defunct	
1903	Pretoria^{†}	Pretoria	South Africa	(South Africa)	Defunct (1909)	Date of formation unknown. First appeared in 1903.
1904	Petone^{†}	Wellington	New Zealand	(New Zealand)	Defunct	
1904	Newtown^{†}	Wellington	New Zealand	(New Zealand)	Defunct	
1904	Wanderers^{†}	Wellington	New Zealand	(New Zealand)	Defunct	
1904	Auckland Imperial^{†}	Auckland	New Zealand	(New Zealand)	Defunct	
1904	Austral^{†}	Auckland	New Zealand	(New Zealand)	Defunct	
1904	Victoria^{†}	Auckland	New Zealand	(New Zealand)	Defunct	Changed name to Eden in 1906
1904	Commonwealth^{†}	Johannesburg	South Africa	(South Africa)	Defunct (1909)	Date of formation unknown. First appeared in 1904.
1904	Central Railways (CSAR)^{†}	Johannesburg	South Africa	(South Africa)	Defunct (1909)	Date of formation unknown. First appeared in 1904.
1904	Germiston^{†}	Johannesburg	South Africa	(South Africa)	Defunct (1909)	Date of formation unknown. First appeared in 1904.
1904	Quambatook Football Club	Quambatook	Victoria	(Australia)	Defunct (2022)	Club was believed to be over 120 years old.
1905	Wynnum^{†}	Brisbane	Queensland	(Australia)	Defunct	Merged with Gordon in 1910. Disappeared in the 1920s. Unrelated to the present day Wynnum Football Club that plays in the QAFL.
1905	Locomotives^{†}	Brisbane	Queensland	(Australia)	Defunct	
1905	Valley^{†}	Fortitude Valley, Brisbane	Queensland	(Australia)	Defunct	Merged with Brisbanes in 1928
1906 March 26	Adelaide University	Adelaide	South Australia	(Australia)	SAAFL	
1906	Koonibba	Koonibba	South Australia	(Australia)		The oldest surviving Aboriginal football club in Australia.
1906	Langhorne Creek	Langhorne Creek	South Australia	(Australia)	Great Southern Football League	
1906	Oxford University	Oxford	United Kingdom	(United Kingdom)	AFL England (National University League)	Oldest existing club in both Europe and outside of Australia. First recorded match was in 1911
1906	East Perth	Perth	Western Australia	(Australia)	West Australian Football League	
1906	Balldale	Balldale	New South Wales	(Australia)	Defunct (1975)	
1907	Brocklesby	Brocklesby	New South Wales	(Australia)	Defunct (2006)	Merged with Burrumbuttock
1907	Hamley Bridge	Hamley Bridge	South Australia	(Australia)	Adelaide Plains Football League	
1908	Newtown^{†}	Auckland	New Zealand	(New Zealand)	Defunct	
1908	Loxton	Loxton	South Australia	(Australia)	Riverland Football League	
1908	Clayton	Melbourne	Victoria	(Australia)	Southern Football League	Have been known as the Magpies, currently known as The Clays.
1909	Mt Roskill^{†}	Auckland	New Zealand	(New Zealand)	Defunct	
1909	Columbia Park^{†}	San Francisco	United States	(United States)	Defunct (1919c)	Founded as juniors club
1909	Berri	Berri	South Australia	(Australia)	Riverland Football League	
1908	Kingscote Football Club	Kangaroo Island	South Australia	(Australia)	Kangaroo Island Football League	
1910	South Brisbane^{†}	Brisbane	Queensland	(Australia)	Defunct	Merged with Yeronga date unknown
1910	Seisoka^{†}	Tokyo	Japan	(Japan)	Defunct	
1911	Carrum^{†}	Carrum	Victoria	(Australia)	Defunct (1996)	Went into recess in 1996. Reformed in 2013 as the Carrum Patterson Lakes Football Club (See entry below)
1907	Burrumbuttock	Burrumbuttock	New South Wales	(Australia)	Defunct (2006)	Merged with Brocklesby
1912	South Melbourne Districts	Melbourne	Victoria	(Australia)	Victorian Amateur Football Association	
1913	Heatherton	Heatherton	Victoria	(Australia)	Southern Football League	Originally named the Heatherton Freighters they are now known as the Tunners
1916	Darwin	Darwin, Northern Territory	Northern Territory	(Australia)	Northern Territory Football League	
1916	Wanderers	Darwin, Northern Territory	Northern Territory	(Australia)	Northern Territory Football League	
1916	Waratah	Darwin, Northern Territory	Northern Territory	(Australia)	Northern Territory Football League	
1918	Murrumbeena	Melbourne	Victoria	(Australia)	Southern Football League	The club began as an Under 18 team in 1918, playing in the Caulfield-Oakleigh-Dandenong Junior Football League.
1919	Edwardstown	Adelaide	South Australia	(Australia)	SAAFL	
1920	Bencubbin	Bencubbin	Western Australia	(Australia)	Central Wheatbelt Football League	
1920	Taringa^{†}	Brisbane	Queensland	(Australia)	Defunct	Changed name to Western Districts Australian Football Club in 1946, merged with Sherwood Districts in 1991
1920	Glenelg	Glenelg	South Australia	(Australia)	South Australian National Football League	Newly formed Club admitted to Reserves B Grade for 1 season before competing in the Senior Competition
1921	Encounter Bay	Encounter Bay	South Australia	(Australia)	Great Southern Football League	
1921	Cambridge University	Cambridge	United Kingdom	(United Kingdom)	AFL England (National University League)	*Possibly formed in 1911 for first recorded match, though did not play regularly until 1921
1921	Claremont	Perth	Western Australia	(Australia)	West Australian Football League	
1923	Zillmere	Brisbane	Queensland	(Australia)	Queensland Australian Football League	Merged with Windsor in 1962
1925	Windsor^{†}	Brisbane	Queensland	(Australia)	Defunct	Merged with Zillmere in 1962
1924	Boe	Boe District	Nauru	(Nauru)	Nauru Australian Football Association	
1924	Denigomodu^{†}	Denigomodu District	Nauru	(Nauru)	Defunct	
1924	Acton	Canberra	Australian Capital Territory	(Australia)	Defunct (1973)	
1924	Queanbeyan	Queanbeyan	New South Wales	(Australia)	AFL Canberra	
1924	Mayne	Everton Hills	Queensland	(Australia)	AFLQ State Association (division 2)	formed as a junior club and became senior club in 1925
1925	Gawler Rovers^{†}	Gawler	South Australia	(Australia)	Defunct (1947)	Formed in 1925 and participated in Gawler Football Association. Joined Lower North Association in 1939. Premiers 1939 and 1940. Rejoined Gawler Association in 1941. In May 1947 the club wound up with a dinner and donating their jerseys to the High School.
1926	Western Suburbs	Sydney	New South Wales	(Australia)	Sydney Australian Football League	
1926	Eastern Suburbs	Sydney	New South Wales	(Australia)	Defunct (1999)	Formed from merger of East Sydney and Paddington clubs
1926	Colonel Light Gardens	Mortlock Park Colonel Light Gardens	South Australia	(Australia)	SAAFL	
1926	Eastlake	Canberra	Australian Capital Territory	(Australia)	NEAFL	Renamed Canberra in 2016
1927	Ainslie	Canberra	Australian Capital Territory	(Australia)	AFL Canberra	Renamed Canberra in 2016
1928	Yeronga	Brisbane	Queensland	(Australia)	AFLQ State Association	
1928	Kedron	Kedron, Brisbane	Queensland	(Australia)	AFLQ State Association	
1928	St George	Sydney	New South Wales	(Australia)	Sydney Australian Football League	
1929	Sandringham	Sandringham (Melbourne)	Victoria	(Australia)	Victorian Football League	
1931	Imperial	Murray Bridge	South Australia	(Australia)	River Murray Football League	
1932	Golden Square	Golden Square	Victoria	(Australia)	Bendigo Football League	
1934	Swan Districts	Perth	Western Australia	(Australia)	West Australian Football League	
1935	Swan Athletic	Perth	Western Australia	(Australia)	Perth Football League	
1935 April	Coorparoo	Brisbane	Queensland	(Australia)	QANFL, QAFL	Seniors folded in 1995 but the Junior club still operate out of Giffin Park.
1936	Box Hill	Box Hill	Victoria	(Australia)	Victorian Football League	
1943	Sandgate	Brisbane	Queensland	(Australia)	Queensland Australian Football League	Merged with Zillmere in 1991 then de-merged
1945	Wilston	Brisbane	Queensland	(Australia)	Queensland Australian Football League	Originally known as Wilston, renamed Wilston-Grange in 1947
1947	Morningside	Brisbane	Queensland	(Australia)	AFLQ State League	
1952	St Marys	Darwin, Northern Territory	Northern Territory	(Australia)	Northern Territory Football League	
1955	Port Moresby ARFC	Port Moresby	Papua New Guinea	(Papua New Guinea)	Defunct (?)	Foundation club of the POM AFL
1955	Boroko-Badili	Port Moresby	Papua New Guinea	(Papua New Guinea)	Defunct (1970)	Foundation club of the POM AFL
1955	North Cairns	Cairns	Queensland	(Australia)	AFL Cairns	
1956	South Cairns	Cairns	Queensland	(Australia)	AFL Cairns	
1956	University of Queensland	Brisbane	Queensland	(Australia)	AFLQ State Association	
1956	Sherwood^{†}	Brisbane	Queensland	(Australia)	Defunct	Formed as junior club. Merged with Sherwood Districts in 1991
1958	Centrals-Trinity Beach	Cairns	Queensland	(Australia)	AFL Cairns	
1959	Central District	Elizabeth	South Australia	(Australia)	South Australian National Football League	New Club which played in SANFL reserves 1959–1963 before competing in the League from 1964
1961	Southport	Southport	Queensland	(Australia)	AFLQ State League	
1961	Surfers Paradise	Surfers Paradise	Queensland	(Australia)	Queensland Australian Football League	
1961	Central Australian	Palm Beach	Queensland	(Australia)	Queensland Australian Football League	Name changed to Palm Beach Currumbin in 1965
1963	Christies Beach	Adelaide	South Australia	(Australia)	Southern Football League	
1964	Labrador	Palm Beach	Queensland	(Australia)	Queensland Australian Football League	
1964	Mount Gravatt	Brisbane	Queensland	(Australia)	AFLQ State League	
1964	Aspley	Brisbane	Queensland	(Australia)	AFLQ State League	
1965	Koboni Demons	Port Moresby	Papua New Guinea	(Papua New Guinea)	Port Moresby Rules Football League	One of the oldest surviving clubs in Papua New Guinea
1965	Werribee	Werribee	Victoria	(Australia)	Victorian Football League	
1966	Victoria Point^{†}	Brisbane	Queensland	(Australia)	Defunct	Changed name to Redlands in 1972
1969	Maroochydore	Maroochydore	Queensland	(Australia)	Queensland Australian Football League	
1969	Aviat^{†}	Port Moresby	Papua New Guinea	(Papua New Guinea)	Defunct (1971)	
1969	Defence	Port Moresby	Papua New Guinea	(Papua New Guinea)	Port Moresby Rules Football League	Formed as Murray Barrack Football Club
1969	Manly-Warringah	Curl Curl, Sydney	New South Wales	(Australia)	AFL Sydney	
1969	Macquarie University	Macquarie Park, Sydney	New South Wales	(Australia)	AFL Sydney	
1970	Palmerston	Palmerston, Northern Territory	Northern Territory	(Australia)	Northern Territory Football League	
1970	Noosa	Noosa	Queensland	(Australia)	Queensland Australian Football League	
1970	Goroka	Goroka	Papua New Guinea	(Papua New Guinea)	Goroka Football League	
1970	PIR Regiment^{†}	Port Moresby	Papua New Guinea	(Papua New Guinea)	Defunct	
1970 October 4	Coolaroo	Toowoomba	Queensland	(Australia)	AFL Darling Downs	
1971	Pennant Hills	Pennant Hills, Sydney	New South Wales	(Australia)	AFL Sydney	
1971	Turner	Canberra	Australian Capital Territory	(Australia)	AFL Canberra	Merged with West Canberra Football Club in 1986 to become Belconnen
1971	Broadbeach	Broadbeach	Queensland	(Australia)	AFLQ State League	
1971	Dysart*	Dysart	Queensland	(Australia)	Central Queensland Highlands AFL Defunct League	Club still continues but has no league to play in.
1972	Sutherland	Sutherland Shire, Sydney	New South Wales	(Australia)	AFL Sydney	
1972	Springwood	Springwood (Logan City)	Queensland	(Australia)	QFA Division 1	
1972	West Bundaberg	Bundaberg	Queensland	(Australia)	AFL Wide Bay	Now known as Brothers Bulldogs Bundaberg (1996–)
1973	Caloundra	Caloundra	Queensland	(Australia)	Queensland Football Association	
1973	Eastern Suburbs Bulldogs	Wellington	New Zealand	(New Zealand)	Wellington AFL	Oldest surviving club in New Zealand
1974	West Canberra Football Club	Canberra	Australian Capital Territory	(Australia)	AFL Canberra	Merged with West Canberra Football Club in 1986 to become Belconnen
1974	North Shore Tigers	Auckland	New Zealand	(New Zealand)	Auckland AFL	
1974	Halagu^{†}	Port Moresby	Papua New Guinea	(Papua New Guinea)	Defunct	
1975	University	Port Moresby	Papua New Guinea	(Papua New Guinea)	Port Moresby Rules Football League	
1975	West New Britain	Kimbe	Papua New Guinea	(Papua New Guinea)	Kimbe Football League	
1975	South West Sydney	Kellyville, Sydney	New South Wales	(Australia)	AFL Sydney	
1975	East Coast Eagles	Macquarie Fields, Sydney	New South Wales	(Australia)	AFL Sydney	
1977	Hervey Bay	Hervey Bay	Queensland	(Australia)	AFL Wide Bay	Started as Seahawks – now Bombers (1985–)
1977	Maryborough	Maryborough	Queensland	(Australia)	AFL Wide Bay	Started as Tigers – now Bears(1995–)
1978	Boroko^{†}	Port Moresby	Papua New Guinea	(Papua New Guinea)	Defunct	Merger of the Bomana and Elcom clubs
1979	West	Port Moresby	Papua New Guinea	(Papua New Guinea)	Port Moresby Rules Football League	
1981	Dubbo	Dubbo	New South Wales	(Australia)	AFL Central West	
1981	Parkes	Parkes	New South Wales	(Australia)	AFL Central West	
1982	Young Saints FC^{†}	Young	New South Wales	(Australia)	Defunct (2018)	Reformed in 2008 after 19 year recess
1982	Orange	Orange	New South Wales	(Australia)	AFL Central West	
1981	Cowra	Cowra	New South Wales	(Australia)	AFL Central West	
1981	University Blues	Auckland	New Zealand	(New Zealand)	Auckland AFL	
1981	Takapuna^{†}	Takapuna, Auckland	New Zealand	(New Zealand)	Defunct	Former Auckland AFL club
1981	Brothers Rockhampton	Rockhampton	Queensland	(Australia)	AFL Capricornia	
1981	Penrith	Penrith, Sydney	New South Wales	(Australia)	AFL Sydney	
1981	Gungahlin	Canberra	Australian Capital Territory	(Australia)	AFL Canberra	
1981	Southern Districts	Darwin, Northern Territory	Northern Territory	(Australia)	Northern Territory Football League	
1982	PINT	Darwin, Northern Territory	Northern Territory	(Australia)	Northern Territory Football League	
1983	Manunda	Cairns	Queensland	(Australia)	AFL Cairns	
1983, November	Narooma Lions	Narooma	New South Wales	(Australia)	Sapphire Coast Australian Football League	
1983	Tathra	Tathra	New South Wales	(Australia)	Sapphire Coast Australian Football League	
1983	Pambula Panthers	Pambula	New South Wales	(Australia)	Sapphire Coast Australian Football League	
1983	Merimbula Diggers	Merimbula	New South Wales	(Australia)	Sapphire Coast Australian Football League	
1983	Eden Whalers	Eden	New South Wales	(Australia)	Sapphire Coast Australian Football League	
1986	Brisbane Bears^{†}	Brisbane	Queensland	(Australia)	Defunct (1996)	Participated in the VFL/AFL from 1987 until 1996, then merged with Fitzroy to form the Brisbane Lions.
1986	West Coast Eagles	Perth	Western Australia	(Australia)	Australian Football League	Participant in the VFL/AFL since the 1987 VFL season.
1987	Belconnen	Canberra	Australian Capital Territory	(Australia)	AFL Canberra	Merger of West Canberra and Turner
1989	Hong Kong Dragons	Hong Kong	China	(China)	South China AFL	
1989	Port Douglas	Port Douglas	Queensland	(Australia)	AFL Cairns	
1990 February 14	Wandsworth Demons	London	United Kingdom	(United Kingdom)	AFL London	
1990 September 12	Adelaide Crows	Adelaide	South Australia	(Australia)	Australian Football League	Participant in the Australian Football League since the 1991 AFL season.
1990	Bermagui Breakers	Bermagui	New South Wales	(Australia)	Sapphire Coast Australian Football League	
1991 November	Tokyo Goannas	Tokyo	Japan	(Japan)	Japan AFL Top League	
1991	Manurewa Raiders	Manurewa, Auckland	New Zealand	(New Zealand)	Auckland AFL	Later renamed South City Raiders
1991	Mt Roskill Saints	Mt Roskill, Auckland	New Zealand	(New Zealand)	Auckland AFL	
1991	Woodville-West Torrens	Woodville	South Australia	(Australia)	South Australian National Football League	Formed from merger of neighbouring Woodville and West Torrens clubs at end of 1990
1993 April 24	Singapore Wombats	Singapore	Singapore	(Singapore)	Asian Australian Football Championships	
1993	Cairns Saints	Cairns	Queensland	(Australia)	AFL Cairns	
1994	Munich Kangaroos	Munich	Germany	(Germany)	Australian Football League Germany	The oldest team in the Australian Football League Germany
1995	Jakarta Bintangs	Jakarta	Indonesia	(Indonesia)	Asian Australian Football Championships	
1995	Wellington City Saints	Wellington	New Zealand	(New Zealand)	Wellington AFL	
1995	Fremantle	Fremantle	Western Australia	(Australia)	Australian Football League	Participant in the Australian Football League since the 1995 AFL season.
1995	Frankfurt Redbacks	Frankfurt	Germany	(Germany)	Australian Football League Germany	
1996	Brisbane Lions	Brisbane	Queensland	(Australia)	Australian Football League	Merger of Fitzroy and the Brisbane Bears. Participating in the Australian Football League since the 1997 AFL season.
1996	Cincinnati Dockers	Cincinnati	United States	(United States)	United States Australian Football League	
1996	Louisville Kings	Louisville	United States	(United States)	United States Australian Football League	
1996	Peel Thunder	Mandurah	Western Australia	(Australia)	West Australian Football League	Participant in the West Australian Football League since the 1997 WAFL season.
1996	Thailand Tigers	Bangkok	Thailand	(Thailand)	Asian Australian Football Championships	
1995	Bali Geckos	Bali	Indonesia	(Indonesia)	Asian Australian Football Championships	
1997	Across The Waves Bundaberg Eagles	Bundaberg	Queensland	(Australia)	AFL Wide Bay	Merger of Norths and Souths
1997	Boston Demons	Boston	United States	(United States)	United States Australian Football League	
1997	Nashville Kangaroos	Nashville	United States	(United States)	United States Australian Football League	
1997	North Carolina Tigers	Raleigh	United States	(United States)	United States Australian Football League	
1997	St. Louis Blues	St. Louis	United States	(United States)	United States Australian Football League	
1997	Denver Bulldogs	Denver	United States	(United States)	United States Australian Football League	
1997	Murray Magpies	Lavington	New South Wales	(Australia)	Hume Football Netball League	
1997	San Diego Lions	San Diego	United States	(United States)	United States Australian Football League	
1998	Bendigo Gold	Bendigo	Victoria	(Australia)	Defunct (2014)	
1998	Atlanta Kookaburras	Atlanta	United States	(United States)	United States Australian Football League	
1998	Chicago Swans	Chicago	United States	(United States)	United States Australian Football League	
1998	Paris Cockerels	Paris	France	(France)	Championnat de France de Football Australien	
1989	Toronto Eagles	Toronto	Canada	(Canada)	AFL Ontario	
1989	High Park Demons	Toronto	Canada	(Canada)	AFL Ontario	
1993	Broadview Hawks	Toronto	Canada	(Canada)	Defunct (2017)	
1990	Hamilton Wildcats	Hamilton, Ontario	Canada	(Canada)	AFL Ontario	
1990	Toronto Rebels	Toronto	Canada	(Canada)	AFL Ontario	
1992	Balmy Beach Saints	Toronto	Canada	(Canada)	Defunct (1997)	
1993	Brampton Wolverines	Brampton	Canada	(Canada)	Defunct (1999)	
1996	Toronto Dingos	Toronto	Canada	(Canada)	AFL Ontario	
1999	Waitakere Magpies	Waitākere, Auckland	New Zealand	(New Zealand)	Auckland AFL	
1999	UNSW-Eastern Suburbs Bulldogs	Daceyville, Sydney	New South Wales	(Australia)	AFL Sydney	Formed from merger of Eastern Suburbs Australian Football Club and University of New South Wales Australian National Football Club
2000	Malaysian Warriors	Kuala Lumpur	Malaysia	(Malaysia)	Asian Australian Football Championships	
2001 January	Vancouver Cougars	Vancouver	Canada	(Canada)	British Columbia Australian Football League	
2001	Grand River Gargoyles	Guelph	Canada	(Canada)	AFL Ontario	
2001	Belfast Redbacks	Belfast	Northern Ireland	(Northern Ireland)	Australian Rules Football League of Ireland	
2002	Austin Crows	Austin	United States	(United States)	United States Australian Football League	
2002	Windsor Mariners	Windsor	Canada	(Canada)	Defunct (2005)	
2003	Etobicoke Kangaroos	Toronto	Canada	(Canada)	AFL Ontario	
2003	London Magpies	London	Canada	(Canada)	Defunct (2005)	
2004	Bay Power	Hervey Bay	Queensland	(Australia)	AFL Wide Bay	Replacement Club for Fraser Coast
2004	Bathurst Bushrangers	Bathurst	New South Wales	(Australia)	AFL Central West	Merger of Charles Sturt University and Bathurst Eagles
2004	Philippine Eagles	Manila	The Philippines	(Philippines)	Asian Australian Football Championships	
2005	Billabong Crows	Oaklands	New South Wales	(Australia)	Hume Football Netball League	Formed by merger of Urana and Oaklands
2005	Brocklesby-Burrumbuttock	Brocklesby	New South Wales	(Australia)	Hume Football Netball League	Formed by merger of Brocklesby and Burrumbuttock
2005	Coreen-Daysdale-Hopefield-Buraja United	Coreen	New South Wales	(Australia)	Hume Football Netball League	Formed by merger
2006	Central Blues	Toronto	Canada	(Canada)	AFL Ontario	
2006	Tiwi Bombers	Darwin, Northern Territory	Northern Territory	(Australia)	Northern Territory Football League	
2006	Pyramid Power^{†}	Gordonvale	Queensland	(Australia)	Defunct (2020)	
2006	Ottawa Swans	Ottawa	Canada	(Canada)	AFL Ontario	
2007	Singapore Sharks	Singapore	Singapore	(Singapore)	Asian Australian Football Championships	
2007	Lao Elephants	Vientiane	Laos	(Laos)	Asian Australian Football Championships	
2007	Vietnam Swans	Saigon	Vietnam	(Vietnam)	Asian Australian Football Championships	
2008	Bengal Tigers	Bengal	India	(India)	AFL India	
2008	Quebec Saints	Montreal	Canada	(Canada)	Defunct (2019)	
2009	Gold Coast Suns	Gold Coast	Queensland	(Australia)	Australian Football League	Participant in the Australian Football League since the 2011 AFL season.
2009	Greater Western Sydney Giants	Sydney	New South Wales	(Australia)	Australian Football League	Participant in the Australian Football League since the 2012 AFL season.
2010	Los Angeles Dragons	Los Angeles	United States	(United States)	United States Australian Football League	
2010	Cambodian Eagles	Phnom Penh	Cambodia	(Cambodia)	Asian Australian Football Championships	
2011	Cairns City	Cairns	Queensland	(Australia)	AFL Cairns	
2012	Howick Hornets	Howick, Auckland	New Zealand	(New Zealand)	Auckland AFL	
2013	Islamabad Tigers	Islamabad	Pakistan	(Pakistan)	AFL Pakistan	
2013	Carrum Patterson Lakes	Carrum	Victoria	(Australia)	Southern Football League	Takes on the history of the Carrum Football Club Est. 1911. Now named 'Carrum Patterson Lakes' to incorporate the suburb of Patterson Lakes which was developed adjacent to Carrum in the 1970s
2013	Bega Bombers	Bega	New South Wales	(Australia)	Sapphire Coast Australian Football League	
2014	Bathurst Giants	Bathurst	New South Wales	(Australia)	AFL Central West	
2016	Rand-Walbundrie-Walla Walla	Rand	New South Wales	(Australia)	Hume Football Netball League	Formed by merger
2017	PNG Muruks	Port Moresby	Papua New Guinea	(Papua New Guinea)	Asian Australian Football Championships	
2019	Mongolian Wolves	Ulaanbaatar	Mongolia	(Mongolia)	Asian Australian Football Championships	
2020	Queenstown	Queenstown	New Zealand	(New Zealand)	Otago AFL	

* = defunct, disputed, poorly documented or dormant for a period.
