= William Warbrick =

NZ international rugby league & sevens rugby player

Will Warbrick
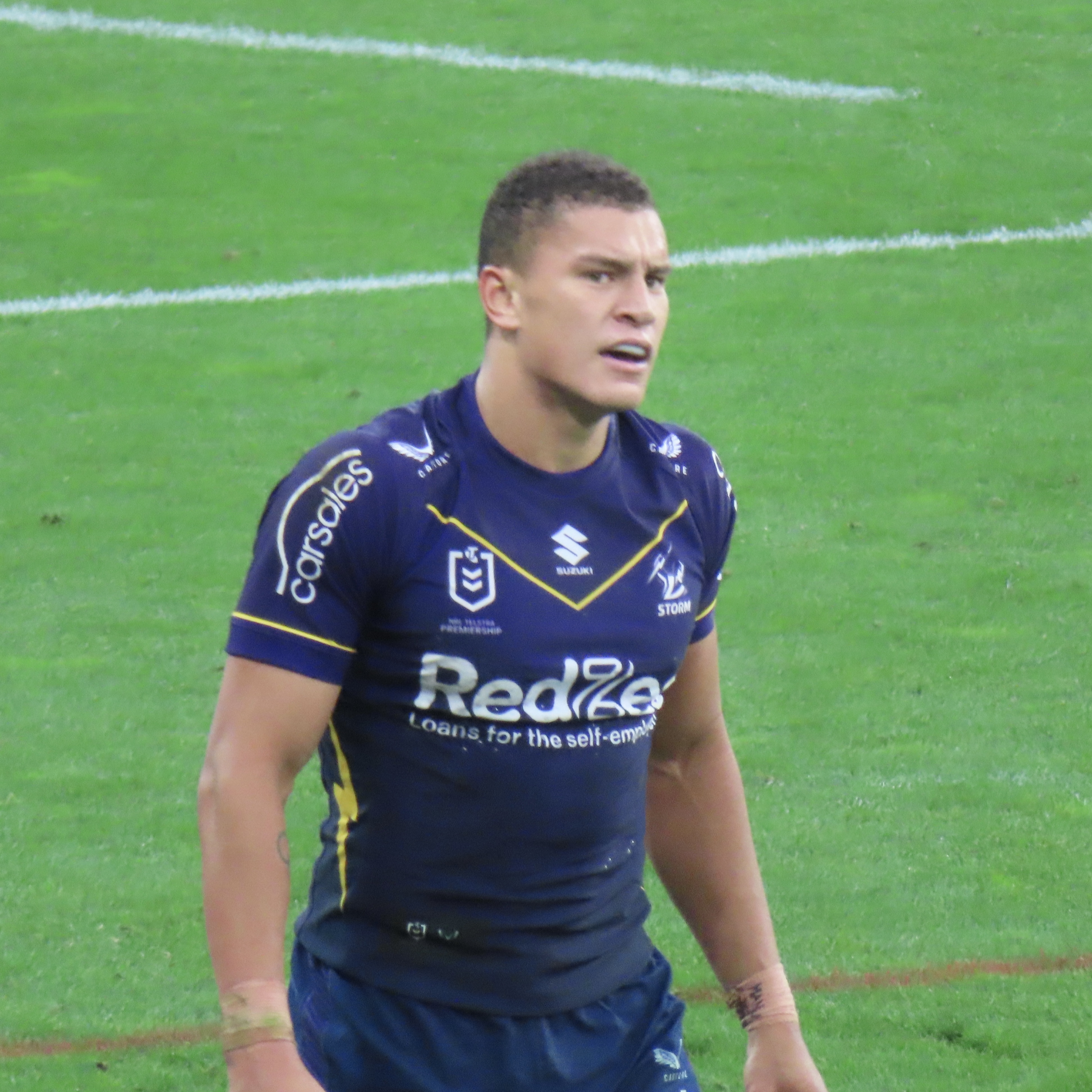

Personal information
- Full name: William Warbrick
- Born: 6 March 1998 (age 28) Kawerau, New Zealand
- Height: 193 cm (6 ft 4 in)
- Weight: 105 kg (16 st 7 lb)

Playing information
- Position: Wing
Club
Years	Team	Pld	T	G	FG	P
	Ngongotaha Chiefs
2022	Sunshine Coast Falcons	14	10
2023–2026	Melbourne Storm	74	53	0	0	212
2027-	New Zealand Warriors	0	0	0	0	0
	Total	88	63	0	0	212
Representative
Years	Team	Pld	T	G	FG	P
2024	New Zealand	2	0	0	0	0
2025	Māori All Stars	1	0	0	0	0
- Source: RLP
Australian rules football career
Personal information
- Positions: Marking forward, midfielder
Playing career
Years	Club	Games (Goals)
- Western Crows
International team honours
Years	Team	Games (Goals)
- New Zealand

Rugby union career
National sevens team
Years	Team	Comps
2019-21	New Zealand 7s	13
Medals
Men's rugby sevens
Representing New Zealand
Olympic Games
Silver medal – second place	2020 Tokyo	Team competition

William Warbrick (born 6 March 1998) is a New Zealand professional rugby league footballer who plays for the New Zealand Warriors in the National Rugby League. Warbrick is a triple international footballer, having represented New Zealand in three football codes: rugby league, rugby sevens and Australian rules football.

== Early life ==
Warbrick was born and raised in Kawerau, New Zealand, of Māori (Ngāi Tai) descent. As a junior, he participated in athletics and also played soccer. He was educated at Rotorua Boys' High School and excelled in athletics, rugby union and league. Warbrick played junior rugby league for Ngongotaha Chiefs in the Bay of Plenty Rugby League.

== Career ==
=== Australian rules football ===
Warbrick began playing Australian rules football as a junior in 2016 on the recommendation of his junior rugby league coach. He was a member of the Western Crows in the AFL New Zealand premiership where he won the Rising Star award and developed as a strong marking forward/midfielder. He was later selected for the New Zealand national Australian rules football team, firstly at Under 18 level, then toured Melbourne with the open age side that played against the AFL National Academy in April 2016. Following his impressive showings with the national side, Warbrick was tested at the AFL New Zealand Combine where he posted a combine record 90cm Standing Vertical Jump, with above average results in the 20 metre sprint and agility with 2.94 and 8.12 respectively and a beep test score of 12.5 but was not signed to an AFL club.

Warbrick has been quoted as saying that he had aspired to follow the professional Australian Football League pathway that was in place for New Zealanders to the St Kilda Football Club. However felt he lacked confidence in the accuracy of his kicking which could hamper a potential career in the sport for which it is a key skill.

Prior to joining New Zealand's Rugby Sevens team, he was approached by the Melbourne Storm with a contract offer, which put an end to his AFL aspirations.

=== Rugby sevens ===
Warbrick made his debut for the New Zealand national rugby sevens team in 2019. In 2021, he won a silver medal at the 2020 Summer Olympics.

=== Professional Rugby league ===
On 4 November 2021, Warbrick signed with the Melbourne Storm on a two-year contract. He spent the majority of the 2022 season playing for Melbourne's affiliate club Sunshine Coast Falcons, scoring ten tries from 14 appearances in the Queensland Cup.

In round 1 of the 2023 NRL season, Warbrick made his NRL and Melbourne Storm debut against the Parramatta Eels. He had his Storm debut jersey (cap 225) presented to him by his sister. Warbrick played a total of 25 games for Melbourne in the 2023 NRL season and scored 17 tries as Melbourne finished third on the table. In the semi-final against the Sydney Roosters, he scored a try with two minutes remaining to win the game for Melbourne. The following week, Warbrick played in the clubs preliminary final loss against Penrith. Warbrick played a total of 24 matches for Melbourne in the 2024 NRL season as the club were runaway minor premiers. Warbrick played in Melbourne's 2024 NRL Grand Final loss against Penrith. Warbrick played only seven games for Melbourne in the 2025 NRL season including their 26–22 2025 NRL Grand Final loss against Brisbane.

=== 2026 ===
On 30 March 2026, the Melbourne outfit announced that Warbrick would depart the club at the end of the season and take up a three-year deal with the New Zealand Warriors. Warbrick played his last game for Melbourne after suffering a season ending Achilles rupture against the Sydney Roosters in round 20. Warbrick played a total of 18 games for Melbourne in the 2026 NRL season as the club finished 10th on the table, missing the finals for the first time since 2010.

== NRL statistics ==
Year	Team	Games	Tries	Pts
2023	Melbourne Storm	25	17	68
2024	Melbourne Storm	24	15	60
2025	Melbourne Storm	7	5	20
2026	Melbourne Storm	18	16	64
2027	New Zealand Warriors			
	Totals	74	53	212
