= AAFL =

AAFL may refer to:

- All American Football League, a professional league of American football
- Auckland Australian Football League, an Australian rules football competition in Auckland, New Zealand
