= George Dempster (footballer) =

Australian rules footballer

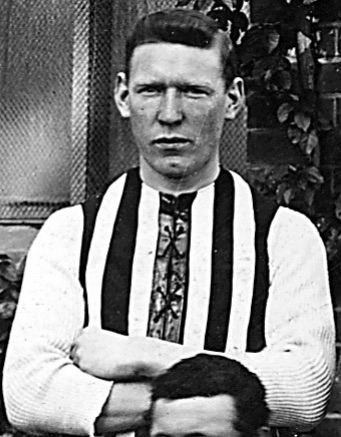

Personal information
- Full name: George Percival Dempster
- Nickname: Percy
- Born: 28 August 1882; Queenstown, South Australia
- Died: 25 February 1960 (aged 77); South Australia

Playing career
Years	Club	Games (Goals)
1904–1912	Port Adelaide	78

Career highlights
- Port Adelaide captain (1911); 2× Port Adelaide premiership player (1906, 1910); New Zealand representative 1908

George Percival Dempster (28 August 1882 – 25 February 1960) was an Australian rules footballer for Port Adelaide. He captained the club in 1911.

Dempster was born in Queenstown, South Australia, to Helen Wylie Caithness Begg and George Wafford Dempster.
