= Sam Dickson (rugby union) =

New Zealand rugby sevens player

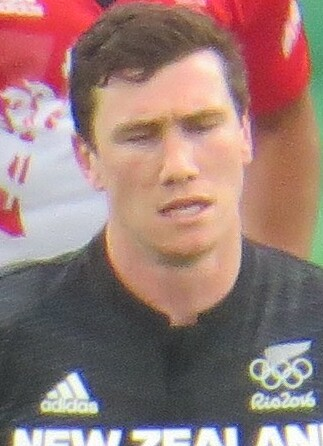
- Born: 28 October 1989 (age 37) Christchurch, New Zealand
- Height: 1.92 m (6 ft 4 in)
- Weight: 99 kg (218 lb; 15 st 8 lb)
- School: St. Thomas of Canterbury College

Rugby union career
- Position: Number 8
Senior career
Years	Team	Apps	(Points)
2018	Otago	2	(0)
2020	Bay of Plenty	6	(5)
2021	Canterbury	4	(5)
- Correct as of 1 December 2023
National sevens team
Years	Team		Comps
2012–	New Zealand		73
- Correct as of 1 December 2023
Medal record
Men's rugby sevens
Representing New Zealand
Commonwealth Games
Bronze medal – third place	2022 Birmingham	Team competition
Gold medal – first place	2018 Gold Coast	Team competition
Silver medal – second place	2014 Glasgow	Team competition
Rugby World Cup Sevens
Silver medal – second place	2022 Cape Town	Team competition

Sam Dickson (born 28 October 1989) is a New Zealand professional rugby union player who plays as a forward for the New Zealand national sevens team.

== Early life ==
Dickson was educated at St Thomas of Canterbury College, Christchurch. He was a member of the New Zealand national Australian rules football team during the 2011 Australian Football International Cup.

== International career ==
Dickson was selected as a member of the New Zealand sevens team to the 2016 Summer Olympics.

Dickson was part of the 2014 Commonwealth Games squad. He is of Māori descent, and affiliates to the Ngāi Tahu iwi. He won a bronze medal with the All Blacks Sevens team at the 2022 Commonwealth Games in Birmingham. He co-captained the team at the Rugby World Cup Sevens in Cape Town. He won a silver medal after his side lost to Fiji in the gold medal final.
