= Mount Gambier Football Club =

Mount Gambier
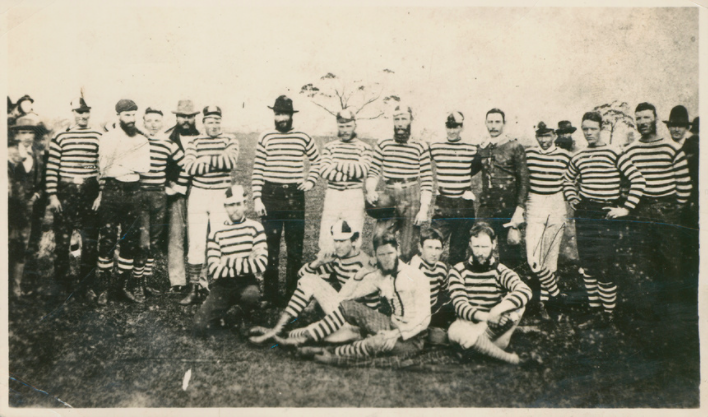

Names
- Full name: Mount Gambier Football Club

Club details
- Founded: 31 August 1867
- Dissolved: circa 1897

The Mount Gambier Football Club was an Australian rules football club established in the city of Mount Gambier, South Australia in 1867. The club dissolved around 1897.

== Early History and Rules ==
Australian Rules Football began in Melbourne in 1858 and reached Mount Gambier in 1867. Early matches were played in various paddocks around the town. A match was arranged on 31 August 1867 between competitors selected from the two Cricket Clubs in the town. The following is an extract, which details the rules, from the announcement from Mount Gambier's 'Boarder Watch' newspaper:

We have been asked to publish the following code of rules adopted by the Mount Gambier Football Club, and they are, we understand, the rules under which all matches in connection with their Club are to be played. They are as follows:

1. The distance between the Goals shall not be more than 200 yards: and the width of playing space (to be measured equally on each side of a line drawn through the centre of the Goals) not more than 150 yards. The Goal Posts shall be seven yards apart, of unlimited height.

2. The Captains on each side shall toss for choice of Goal, the side losing the toss, or a Goal, has the kick off from the centre point between the Goals. After a goal is kicked the sides shall change ends.

3. A Goal must be kicked fairly between the posts without touching either of them, or any portion of the person of one of the opposite side. In case of the Ball being forced (except with the hands or arms) between the Goal Posts in a scrimmage, a Goal shall be awarded.

4. Two posts, to be called the "kick-off" posts shall be erected at a distance of 20 yards on each side of the Goal Posts, and in a straight line with them.

5. In case the ball is kicked behind Goal, any one of the side behind whose Goal it is kicked may bring it 20 yards in front of any portion of the space between the " kick-off" posts, and shall kick it towards the Goal.

6. Any player catching the Ball directly from the foot or leg may call " Mark;" then has a free kick, from any spot in a line with his mark and the centre of his opponents Goal Posts; no player being allowed to come inside the spot marked, of within five yards in any other direction.

7. Tripping and hacking are strictly prohibited. Pushing with the bands or body is allowed when any player is in rapid motion. Holding is only allowed while a player has the Ball in hand, except in the case provided in Rule 6.

8. The Ball may be taken in hand at any time, but not carried further than is necessary for a kick, and no player shall run with the Ball unless he strikes it against, the ground in every five or six yards.

9. When a Ball goes out of bounds (the same being indicated by a row of posts), it shall be brought back to the point where it crossed the boundary-line, and thrown in at right angles with that line.

10. The Ball while in Play may under no circumstances be thrown.

11. In case of deliberate infringement of any of the above Rules, the Captain of the opposite side may claim that any of his party may have a free kick from the place where the breach of Rule, was made.

12. Before the commencement of a match each side shall appoint an Umpire, and they shall be the sole Judges of Goals and breaches of Rules. The nearest Umpire shall be appealed to in every case of dispute.

— Border Watch (Mount Gambier), 31 August 1867, p. 2.
