= Tracy Inglis =

New Zealand medical practitioner and surgeon

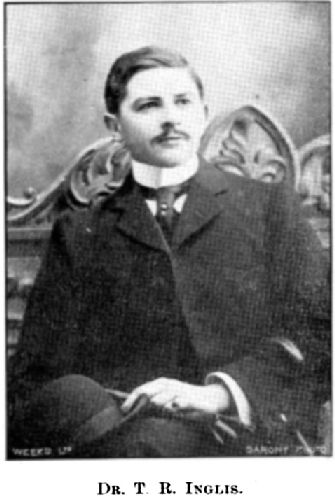
Inglis, c. 1901

Tracy Russell Inglis CBE OStJ VD (1875 – 6 February 1937) was an Auckland medical practitioner, war surgeon and sports administrator.

== Early life and family ==
Inglis was born in Glasgow, Scotland, in 1875, the grandson of Irish-born Australian physician, Dr Richard Thomas Tracy (1826–1874). He was educated at the Church of England Grammar School, Melbourne. Following this he attended Melbourne University, qualifying MB ChB in 1899. He married Grace Utting at St Matthew's Church in Hobson Street, Auckland, on Wednesday 24 December 1902. Sometime around 1916 he adopted the name, Russell Tracy-Inglis.

== Medical career ==
Inglis was House Physician and Senior Medical Officer of the Auckland Hospital from January 1900 until 31 December 1901. He was a medical superintendent of the St Helens Hospital in Auckland from 1906 to 1936. In 1927 Inglis was the inaugural president of the New Zealand Obstetrical and Gynaecological Society and in 1933 became chairman of the honorary medical staff at Auckland's Karitane Hospital.

== War service ==
Inglis volunteered for the New Zealand Medical Corps in 1915 and served on several voyages of the hospital ship SS Maheno. At the time of the first voyage his rank was lieutenant-colonel, rising to the rank of colonel by the fourth voyage.

== Sporting ==
From 1905 until at least 1910, Inglis was president of the Australian Football League of Auckland. Tracy-Inglis was the inaugural president of the Grafton Tennis Club on its formation in 1930. Also in 1930, he was elected president of the Auckland Bowling Club for the 1931 season.

== Honours ==
Inglis was appointed Commander of the Order of the British Empire in December 1919. In 1933 he was appointed an Officer of the Order of St John. He was awarded the King George V Silver Jubilee Medal in 1935.
