= Auckland Australian Football League =

Auckland Australian Football League (AAFL)
- Formerly: Auckland Australian Football Association (AAFA)
- Sport: Australian rules football
- Founded: 1974; 52 years ago
- No. of teams: 6
- Country: New Zealand
- Most recent champion: North Shore Tigers (2024)
- Most titles: 18
- Website: www.aafl.co.nz

The Auckland Australian Football League which began in 1974, is an amateur Australian rules football competition in Auckland, New Zealand currently consisting of 6 clubs and is one of the leagues governed by AFL New Zealand. The league has a men's competition and affiliated women's competition known as Auckland Women's AFL featuring some of the same clubs. The competition runs from September to December to avoid clashes with the rugby football season.

An earlier league which existed in Auckland from 1904 until the outbreak of World War I was also known, for a time, as the Auckland Australian Football League.

== History ==
The Auckland Australian Football Association (AAFA) was founded by former Australian professional player Terry Gay in 1974, North Shore Tigers were one of the foundation clubs. Four teams were playing in 1988 and it shifted its season to spring. It was renamed Auckland Australian Football League (AAFL) in 1990.

In 2012 the AAFL established a 2nd Division for less competitive clubs however this lasted only one year before all clubs were to play in first division.

The league went through a period of strong growth in the 2010s with players like Michael Boyce, Shane Leat, Te Kopa Tipene-Thomas, Andriu Sucu and Jackson Clince among the players selected to represent New Zealand on the international stage helping to attract more media exposure for the sport in the city.

Season 2021 was cancelled due to COVID-19 pandemic restrictions.

The competition resumed in 2022 where the North Shore Tigers became the first team to go undefeated for an entire season, going 12-0 including finals.. This record has been added to in subsequent years with the Tigers going on to remain undefeated through the 2023 and 2024 seasons currently sitting at 44 games undefeated.

== Current clubs ==
=== Men ===
Club	Colours	Nickname	Location	Est.	Years in AAFL	AAFL Premierships	
Club	Colours	Nickname	Location	Est.	Years in AAFL	Total	Years
Howick (formerly Pakuranga)		Hornets	Paparoa Park, Howick	2012	2012-	0	-
Mt Roskill		Saints	War Memorial Park, Mount Roskill	1991	1991-	3	1997, 2005, 2012
North Shore		Tigers	Sunnynook Park, Sunnynook	1974	1974-	15	1977, 1978, 1980, 1990, 1991, 1992, 1994, 1998, 2008, 2017, 2020, 2022, 2023, 2024, 2025
South City (formerly Manurewa)		Raiders	Mountfort Park, Manurewa	1991	1991-	2	1995, 1996
University		Blues	Colin Maiden Park, Glen Innes	1981	1981-	20	1981, 1982, 1983, 1987, 1988, 1989, 1993, 1999, 2000, 2002, 2003, 2004, 2006, 2007, 2009, 2011, 2014, 2015, 2018, 2019
Waitākere		Magpies	Parrs Park, Oratia	1999	1999-	3	2010, 2013, 2016

=== Women ===
Club	Colours	Nickname	Location	Est.	Years in AAFL	AAFL Premierships	
Club	Colours	Nickname	Location	Est.	Years in AAFL	Total	Years
Auckland		Blues	Colin Maiden Park, Glen Innes	1981	2020-	1	2025
North Shore		Tigers	Sunnynook Park, Sunnynook	1974	2020-	3	2020*, 2023, 2024
Waitākere		Magpies	Parrs Park, Oratia	1999	2020-	2	2020*, 2022

*2020 Women's title won by Norwest Magpies - an amalgamated side between Waitakere and North Shore

=== Former clubs ===
Club	Colours	Nickname	Location	Formed
Takapuna Eagles		Eagles	Takapuna	1981

== Locations ==
Location map of current clubs in the league.

== Results ==
=== Men's ===
Year	Premier	Runner up	Result
2024	North Shore Tigers	Waitakere Magpies	82 (12.10) - 45 (7.3)
2023	North Shore Tigers	Waitakere Magpies	34 (4.10) - 32 (4.8)
2022	North Shore Tigers	University Blues	50 (8.2) - 32 (4.8)
2020	North Shore Tigers	University Blues	87 (14.3) - 34 (5.4)
2019	University Blues	North Shore Tigers	
2018	University Blues	Mt Roskill Saints	
2017	North Shore Tigers	Waitakere Magpies	87 (14.3)- 64 (10.4)

=== Women's ===
Year	Premier	Runner up	Result
2025	Auckland Blues	North Shore Tigers	36 (5.6) - 24 (3.6)
2024	North Shore Tigers	Waitakere Magpies	28 (4.4) - 27 (3.9)
2023	North Shore Tigers	Waitakere Magpies	36 (6.0) - 3 (0.3)
2022	Waitakere Magpies	North Shore Tigers	54-5

== Historic League ==
The 'Auckland Football Association (under Victorian rules)' was formed at a meeting at Foresters' Hall, Newton on 28 April 1904. The initial subscription rate was 2s 6d, and forty members were enrolled at that meeting. At the 1906 AGM, the name was changed to 'The Australian Football League of Auckland' in order to differentiate the league from Rugby Union and Association (soccer) football. After several active seasons which were covered in some depth in the local papers, the league went into decline around the end of the decade due to the departure of a number of the Australian players back home. In 1912 the senior competition was put on hold due to the lack of players, with only a junior competition continuing.

=== Clubs ===
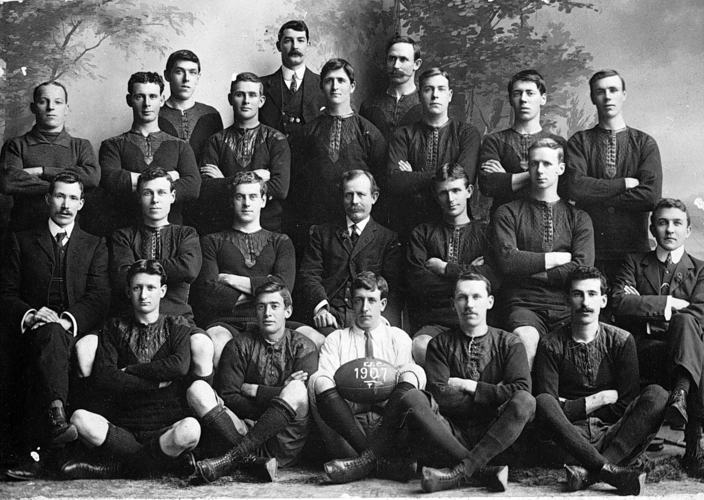
Eden Football Club. Australian Football League of Auckland premiers 1907

Club	Formed	Participating years	Notes
Imperial	1904	1904-1911	Formerly Auckland Imperial.
Austral	1904	1904-1910	
Eden	1904	1904-1911	Formerly Victoria, name changed in 1906
Newtown	1908	1908	
Mt Roskill	1909	1909-1911	

=== Players ===
A number of the players in the league were immigrants from the southern Australian states. Regular mention was made in the newspaper reports of the arrival of these gentlemen and their intentions to play football in Auckland.

Four VFL players played for the league at various times, including Vic Cumberland who was rated one of the best VFL players of the day:

Player	Years in Auckland	VFL Club details
Ben Sandford	1904 –	St Kilda 1901-03
Vic Cumberland	1905–1906	Melbourne 1898–1901; St Kilda 1903-04 1907-08 1912-15 1920
Hughie Webb	1905	Geelong 1900-03
Hughie Callan	1906	Essendon 1903–05; South Melbourne 1907-1910

=== Administrators ===
The inaugural president of the league in 1904 was a Mr McNamara. He was supported by a large committee that included 5 vice presidents; Messrs Hale, McKeon, Walsh, Kneebone and McVeigh. At the 1905 AGM, Dr Tracy Inglis was elected president, a position he held for a number of years. The league had a number of prominent people involved during it existence. Patrons of the league in 1905 included politicians George Fowlds and F E Baume.

=== Competition ===
The new league's first game was a scratch match held on 30 April on the outer Domain. Several rounds of practice matches followed prior to the start of the competition. By the end of the 1904 season Austral and Imperial were "on a level footing", with Austral taking the honours, 29 to 18, in the final which was held at the Domain Cricket Ground.
