= Canterbury Australian Football League =

Australian rules football competition in New Zealand

Canterbury Australian Football League (CAFL)
- Formerly: Canterbury Australian Football Association (CAFA)
- Sport: Australian rules football
- Founded: 1974; 52 years ago
- No. of teams: 4
- Country: New Zealand
- Website: www.cafl.co.nz

The Canterbury Australian Football League is an Australian rules football competition in New Zealand and is one of the Leagues governed by AFL New Zealand. The league was formed in 1974 and became the Canterbury Australian Football League in 1998. The league includes both senior men's, women's teams and junior teams. Competition runs from late August to early November in the Bob Dean's Triangle Fields in Hagley Park.

== Clubs ==
All games are played at Queen Elizabeth II Oval, New Brighton

=== Men ===
Club	Colours	Nickname	Est.	Years in CAFL	CAFL Premierships	
Club	Colours	Nickname	Est.	Years in CAFL	Total	Years
Blues (Eastern Blues)		Blues	1999	1999-	10	2000, 2003, 2006, 2007, 2008, 2014, 2022, 2023, 2024, 2025
Christchurch		Bulldogs	2006	2006-	6	2009, 2010, 2013, 2016, 2017, 2019
Mid Canterbury		Eagles	2003	2003-	5	2011, 2012, 2015, 2020, 2021
University		Cougars	2000	2000-	3	2004, 2005, 2018

=== Women ===
Club	Colours	Nickname	Est.	Years in CAFL	CAFL Premierships	
Club	Colours	Nickname	Est.	Years in CAFL	Total	Years
Dolphins		Dolphins	2023	2023-	1	2023
Panthers		Panthers	2023	2023-	1	2024
