= Wayne Schwass =

Australian rules footballer, born 1968

Personal information
- Nickname: Swatta
- Born: 27 November 1968 (age 57); Christchurch, New Zealand
- Original team: South Warrnambool
- Height: 180 cm (5 ft 11 in)
- Weight: 80 kg (176 lb)

Playing career^{1}
Years	Club	Games (Goals)
1988–1997	North Melbourne	184 (97)
1998–2002	Sydney Swans	98 (57)
Total		282 (154)
- ^{1} Playing statistics correct to the end of 2002.

Career highlights
- North Melbourne Best and Fairest 1994, 1995; North Melbourne Premiership player 1996; Sydney Swans Best and Fairest 1999; All-Australian 1999; New Zealand Falcons 2012

Wayne Schwass (born 27 November 1968) is a former professional Australian rules footballer in the Australian Football League. He is notable as being the first New Zealand–born AFL player known to be of Māori heritage. He holds the record for VFL/AFL matches played by a New Zealand–born player, with 282.

Schwass has been a long supporter and ambassador for Australian rules football in New Zealand, and represented his country in 2012 as part of the New Zealand national team, becoming the first home-grown AFL player to play, captain and coach a country other than Australia in the sport.

== Early life ==
Schwass was born in Christchurch, New Zealand, to mother Rae and Māori father Colin. They moved to the Warrnambool area in Victoria, Australia, when Wayne was three years old. He began playing Australian Rules at the South Warrnambool Football Club at the age of 10.

An outstanding talent, Schwass was recruited by Kangaroos as a junior and captained the North Melbourne under-19s to the premiership in 1987 and took out the Morrish Medal as the best and fairest in the under-19s.

He was educated at Warrnambool North Technical School (now part of Warrnambool College) from year 7-11 before competing his final year (year 12) at Trinity Grammar in Melbourne.

== AFL career ==
Following his senior debut in 1988, Schwass became a champion wingman, known for his blistering pace, courage, and accuracy on his left foot. Schwass won the club champion award, the Syd Barker Medal, twice at North Melbourne, in 1994 and 1995. He was one of the best in the Kangaroos' 1996 premiership side against Sydney and was named vice-captain to Wayne Carey.

In 1998 in the twilight of his career, North Melbourne traded Schwass to Sydney in exchange for a young Shannon Grant.

At the Sydney Swans the following year, Schwass was an instant leader, taking out the club's best-and-fairest award and earning All-Australian selection. He would retire a few seasons later, playing just short of 100 games with the Swans, ending his serviceable AFL career.

== Post-AFL career ==
In 2012, Schwass was a player-coach for the New Zealand representative AFL side, the New Zealand Falcons, against the Australian AIS-AFL Academy team.

== Personal life ==
Schwass is now founder and CEO of PukaUp, a social enterprise concerned with mental health and emotional wellbeing." A regular on the public-speaking circuit, Schwass also hosts the PukaUp Podcast with PodcastONE. Schwass is still involved with AFL as a commentator for Triple M on Saturday nights and Sunday afternoons.

== Statistics ==
Legend
G	Goals	K	Kicks	D	Disposals	T	Tackles
B	Behinds	H	Handballs	M	Marks

Season	Team	No.	Games	Totals							Averages (per game)							Votes
Season	Team	No.	Games	G	B	K	H	D	M	T	G	B	K	H	D	M	T	Votes
1988	North Melbourne	46	7	3	4	95	34	129	21	20	0.4	0.6	13.6	4.9	18.4	3.0	2.9	0
1989	North Melbourne	2	22	14	10	265	177	442	40	51	0.6	0.5	12.0	8.0	20.1	1.8	2.3	10
1990	North Melbourne	2	15	7	6	173	121	294	27	27	0.5	0.4	11.5	8.1	19.6	1.8	1.8	3
1991	North Melbourne	2	21	8	10	306	147	453	75	46	0.4	0.5	14.6	7.0	21.6	3.6	2.2	13
1992	North Melbourne	2	14	7	5	209	91	300	41	37	0.5	0.4	14.9	6.5	21.4	2.9	2.6	2
1993	North Melbourne	2	19	14	5	313	124	437	32	49	0.7	0.3	16.5	6.5	23.0	1.7	2.6	14
1994	North Melbourne	2	24	15	13	353	177	530	54	61	0.6	0.5	14.7	7.4	22.1	2.3	2.5	19
1995	North Melbourne	2	25	19	14	381	171	552	77	50	0.8	0.6	15.2	6.8	22.1	3.1	2.0	13
1996†	North Melbourne	2	17	3	5	214	89	303	46	33	0.2	0.3	12.6	5.2	17.8	2.7	1.9	6
1997	North Melbourne	2	20	7	5	264	89	353	53	46	0.4	0.3	13.2	4.5	17.7	2.7	2.3	8
1998	Sydney	2	22	23	6	380	127	507	61	38	1.0	0.3	17.3	5.8	23.0	2.8	1.7	15
1999	Sydney	2	23	9	9	429	184	613	98	49	0.4	0.4	18.7	8.0	26.7	4.3	2.1	19
2000	Sydney	2	22	12	14	347	195	542	102	65	0.5	0.6	15.8	8.9	24.6	4.6	3.0	8
2001	Sydney	2	22	12	8	295	152	447	79	54	0.5	0.4	13.4	6.9	20.3	3.6	2.5	7
2002	Sydney	2	9	1	1	75	55	130	14	15	0.1	0.1	8.3	6.1	14.4	1.6	1.7	0
Career			282	154	115	4099	1933	6032	820	641	0.5	0.4	14.5	6.9	21.4	2.9	2.3	137
