= Terry Gay =

Australian rules footballer

Personal information
- Full name: Terry Gay
- Born: 18 January 1947 (age 79)
- Original team: Scoresby
- Height: 188 cm (6 ft 2 in)
- Weight: 83 kg (183 lb)
- Position: Half Forward

Playing career^{1}
Years	Club	Games (Goals)
1966–70	Hawthorn	65 (39)
- ^{1} Playing statistics correct to the end of 1970.

Terry Gay (born 18 January 1947) is a former Australian rules footballer who played with Hawthorn in the Victorian Football League (VFL).
