= Wellington Australian Football League =

Wellington Australian Football League (WAFL)
- Formerly: Wellington Australian Football Association (WAFA)
- Sport: Australian rules football
- Founded: 1974; 52 years ago
- No. of teams: 4
- Country: New Zealand
- Sponsors: Pelorus Trust, NZ Community Trust and Infinity Foundation
- Website: https://wellingtonafl.co.nz/

Wellington AFL is an Australian rules football competition in Wellington, New Zealand consisting of 4 men's and 2 women's clubs and is one of the Leagues governed by AFL New Zealand. It was founded in 1974. The current Wellington women's league was founded in 2021.

== Clubs ==
All games are played at Hutt Park, Lower Hutt

=== Men ===
Club	Colours	Nickname	Est.	Years in WAFL	WAFL Premierships	
Club	Colours	Nickname	Est.	Years in WAFL	Total	Years
Crows		Crows	2025	2025-	0	-
Giants		Giants	2025	2025-	0	-
Suns		Suns	2025	2025-	0	-

=== Women ===
Club	Colours	Nickname	Est.	Years in WAFL	WAFL Premierships	
Club	Colours	Nickname	Est.	Years in WAFL	Total	Years
Ngā Manu Rere			2021	2021-	0	-
South Coast Swell		Swell	2021	2021-	4	2021, 2022, 2023, 2024

=== Former ===
Club	Colours	Nickname	Home Ground	Est.	Years in WAFL	WAFL Premierships		Fate
Club	Colours	Nickname	Home Ground	Est.	Years in WAFL	Total	Years	Fate
Eastern Suburbs		Bulldogs		1973	1973-2024	11	1996, 1998, 2000, 2001, 2005, 2007, 2008, 2009, 2014, 2019, 2022	Replaced by Crows, Giants and Suns after 2024 season
Hutt Valley Eagles		Eagles		Late 1990s	Late 1990s-2024	2	2010, 2011	Replaced by Crows, Giants and Suns after 2024 season
Lower Hutt		Tigers	Hutt Park, Lower Hutt		?	0	-	Merged with Upper Hutt to form Hutt Valley Eagles
North City Demons		Demons		Before 2001	?-2022	0	-	Folded after 2022 season
Upper Hutt		Eagles			?	1	1995	Merged with Lower Hutt to form Hutt Valley Eagles
Wellington City		Saints	Kelburn Park, Kelburn	1994	1994-2022	1	2018	Folded after 2022 season

== Results ==
=== Men's ===
Year	Premier	Runner up	Result
2024			
2023			
2022	Eastern Suburbs Bulldogs	Hutt Valley Eagles	
2019	Eastern Suburbs Bulldogs	Wellington City Saints	53-23
2018	Wellington City Saints	Eastern Suburbs Bulldogs	37-34
2014	Eastern Suburbs Bulldogs	North City Demons	84-40
2011	Hutt Valley Eagles	Eastern Suburbs Bulldogs	75-52
2010	Hutt Valley Eagles	Eastern Suburbs Bulldogs	
2009	Eastern Suburbs Bulldogs		
2008	Eastern Suburbs Bulldogs		
2007	Eastern Suburbs Bulldogs		
2005	Eastern Suburbs Bulldogs		
2001	Eastern Suburbs Bulldogs		
2000	Eastern Suburbs Bulldogs		
1998	Eastern Suburbs Bulldogs		
1996	Eastern Suburbs Bulldogs		
1995	Upper Hutt	Eastern Suburbs Bulldogs	

=== Women's ===
Year	Premier	Runner up	Result
2024	South Coast Swell	Ngā Manu Rere	37-14
2023	South Coast Swell	Ngā Manu Rere	68-27
2022	South Coast Swell	Ngā Manu Rere	44-9
2021	South Coast Swell	Ngā Manu Rere	18-10
2020	'Tigers'	'Saints'	34-13

2020 Season of 'Tigers' v 'Saints' was the foundation to what became the WAFL Women's League

== Historic League ==
The Wellington League of Australian Football ran from 1904 until the end of 1909. The league was formed in May 1904 at a meeting in Wellington, with the secretary being J.T. Kelly and had two founding clubs: Lefroy and Federal and played its first match at Seatoun Park. The league expanded to five clubs in its first season. Despite substantial growth it finally folded due to ongoing access issues with the Football Association to its primary venue the Basin Reserve due to a lack of alternative venues.

=== Clubs ===
Club	Location	Formed	Colours
City Football Club (formerly Lefroy)	Wellington	1903	Dark and light blue
Federal Football Club	Carlton Hall grounds, Vivian Street Wellington	1903	
Petone Football Club	Petone	1904	
Newtown Football Club	Newtown, New Zealand	1904	
Wanderers Football Club (formerly Imperial)	Sports Club, Wellington	1904	
