= U Sports women's soccer championship =

Canadian university soccer tournament

- Most recent season or competition: 2026 U Sports Women's Soccer Championship
- Sport: Association football
- Founded: 1987; 39 years ago
- First season: 1987
- Organizing body: U Sports
- No. of teams: 8
- Country: Canada
- Most recent champion: Guelph (1st title) (2026)
- Most titles: UBC (9 titles)
- Streaming partners: CBC Sports; CBC Gem
- Related competitions: U Sports men's soccer championship
- Website: usports.ca/championship

The U Sports Women's Soccer Championship is a Canadian university soccer tournament conducted by U Sports, and determines the women's national champion. The tournament involves the champions from each of Canada's four regional sports conferences. The Gladys Bean Memorial Trophy is awarded to the winners.

Guelph Gryphons are the reigning champions, winning in 2026 for the first time. UBC Thunderbirds are the most successful program with nine championships. Trinity Western Spartans are the next most successful program, having won five championships.

== Format ==
The championship features eight teams in single-elimination matches to determine a national champion. The championship hosts 11 games over four days at a predetermined host venue. The host team is automatically qualified for the tournament, as is each of the conference champions, with additional berths awarded for the remaining spots.

== Results ==
Key

- (1) – Title number
- a.e.t. – Match went to extra time
- p – Match decided by a penalty shootout after extra time

Ed.	Season	Winner	Score	Runner-up	Venue / city	Ref.
1	1987	UBC (1)	? (3–2 p)	McMaster	McGill University	
2	1988	Queen's (1)	2–0	Acadia	University of British Columbia	
3	1989	Alberta (1)	3–1	McGill	Acadia University	
4	1990	Acadia (1)	1–0	UBC	University of British Columbia	
5	1991	McMaster (1)	8–2	McGill	University of Guelph	
6	1992	Laurier (1)	1–0	McGill	McMaster University	
7	1993	UBC (2)	2–1	Dalhousie	McGill University	
8	1994	Dalhousie (1)	0–0 (3–2 p)	UBC	University of Alberta	
9	1995	Laurier (2)	1–0	Dalhousie	Carleton University	
10	1996	Ottawa (1)	1–0 (a.e.t.)	Alberta	Dalhousie University	
11	1997	Alberta (2)	1–0 (a.e.t.)	Ottawa	Université Laval	
12	1998	Calgary (1)	3–2	Victoria	Centennial Stadium, Victoria	
13	1999	Dalhousie (2)	2–0	Alberta	Wilfrid Laurier	
14	2000	Dalhousie (3)	1–0	Ottawa	Acadia University	
15	2001	Alberta (3)	2–1	McGill	Carleton	
16	2002	UBC (3)	2–1 (a.e.t.)	Alberta	University of Alberta	
17	2003	UBC (4)	5–0	Ottawa	Molson Stadium, McGill	
18	2004	Trinity Western (1)	2–2 (3–2 p)	McGill	CEPSUM Complex, Montréal	
19	2005	Victoria Vikes (1)	3–0	Ottawa	University of Alberta	
20	2006	UBC (5)	3–1	Queen's	Centennial Stadium, Victoria	
21	2007	Cape Breton (1)	2–1	York	Cape Breton	
22	2008	Trinity Western (2)	1–0	Brock	Trinity Western University	
23	2009	Trinity Western (3)	0–0 (4–2 p)	Montreal–	Varsity Stadium, Toronto	
24	2010	Queen's (2)	1–0 (a.e.t.)	Wilfrid Laurier	UPEI Turf, Prince Edward Island	
25	2011	Queen's (3)	0–0 (3–1 p)	Montreal	Molson Stadium, McGill	
26	2012	Trinity Western (4)	? (p)	Queen's Gaels	Centennial Stadium, Victoria	
27	2013	Trinity Western (5)	1–0	Montreal	Varsity Stadium, Toronto	
28	2014	Laval (1)	5–0	Trinity Western	TELUS-Université Laval Stadium, Laval	
29	2015	UBC (6)	3–0	Trinity Western	Thunderbird Stadium, British Columbia	
30	2016	Laval (2)	2–1	UBC	Raymond Field, Acadia	
31	2017	Montreal (1)	1–0	Cape Breton	Subway Soccer South Complex, Manitoba	
32	2018	Ottawa (2)	2–1	Trinity Western	Gee-Gees Field, Ottawa	
33	2019	UBC (7)	1–0	Calgary	Centennial Stadium, Victoria	
–	2020	(Cancelled due to the COVID-19 pandemic) – awarded host: Cape Breton				
34	2021	MacEwan (1)	1–1 (3–2 p)	Trinity Western	Health Recreation Complex, Cape Breton	
35	2022	Montreal (2)	1–0	Laval Rouge et Or	TELUS-Université Stadium, Laval	
36	2023	UBC (8)	1–0 (a.e.t.)	Trinity Western	Richardson Stadium, Queen's	
37	2024	UBC (9)	1–0	Laval Rouge et Or	Wickwire Field, Dalhousie	
38	2025	Montreal (3)	2–1	UBC	McMaster, Hamilton	
39	2026	Guelph (1)	1–0 (a.e.t.)	Trinity Western	Thunderbird Stadium, British Columbia	
40	2027				McMahon Stadium, Calgary	

== Awards ==
=== U Sports Championship MVP ===
The selection is made by a committee established by the host of the U Sports championship.

Season	Recipient	Team
2026	Isabella Trepanier	Guelph
2025	Karine Vilain	Montreal
2024	Sienna Gibson	UBC
2023	Katalin Tolnai	UBC
2022	Megane Sauve	Montreal
2021	Samantha Gouveia	MacEwan
2020	Cancelled due to the COVID-19 pandemic	
2019	Danielle Steer	UBC
2018	Miranda Smith	Ottawa
2017	Marie-Ève Bernard O'Breham	Montreal
2016	Joëlle Gosselin	Laval
2015	Jasmin Dhanda	UBC
2014	Joëlle Gosselin	Laval
2013	Vanessa Kovacs	Trinity Western
2012	Jennifer Castillo	Trinity Western
2011	Chantel Marson	Queen's University
2010	Kelsey Tikka	Laurier
2009	Tessa Meyer	Trinity Western
2008	Daniela Gerig	Trinity Western
2007	Kylie Snow	Cape Breton
2006	Amy Bobb	UBC
2005	Carey Gustafson	Victoria
2004	Danielle Day	McGill
2003	Rosalyn Hicks	UBC
2002	Sarah Regan	UBC
2001	Aishatu Alfa	Alberta
2000	Claire Martin	Dalhousie
1999	Stef Finateri	Dalhousie
1998	Stephanie O'Neill	Calgary
1997	Heather Murray	Alberta
1996	Danielle Vella	Ottawa
1995	Camilla Vejvalka	Laurier
1994	Carla Perry	Dalhousie
1993	Tammy Crawford	UBC
1992	Nancy Ferguson	UBC
1991	Lydia Vamos	McMaster
1990	Alison Tuton	Acadia
1989	Jane Wood	Alberta

== See also ==
- NCAA Division I women's soccer tournament
- U Sports men's soccer championship
- College soccer
