= 2026 U Sports Women's Soccer Championship =

Tournament details
- Country: Canada
- Cities: Vancouver, British Columbia
- Venue: Thunderbird Stadium
- Dates: November 12–15, 2026
- Teams: 8

Final positions
- Champions: Guelph Gryphons
- Runners-up: Trinity Western Spartans
- Third place: Laval Rouge et Or
- Fourth place: Thompson Rivers WolfPack

Tournament statistics
- Matches played: 11
- Goals scored: 30 (2.73 per match)
- Attendance: 8,527 (775 per match)
- Top goal scorer: Isabella Trepanier (3)

Awards
- Championship MVP: Isabella Trepanier

The 2026 U Sports Women's Soccer Championship was the 39th edition of the U Sports women's soccer championship, a postseason tournament to determine the national champion of the 2026 U Sports women's soccer season. The tournament was played November 12–15, 2026 at Thunderbird Stadium on the Vancouver campus of UBC.

== Host ==
The tournament was held at Thunderbird Stadium, on the Vancouver campus of UBC. This was the 4th U Sports women's soccer championship event hosted at UBC, having previously hosted in 1988, 1990, and 2015.

== Format ==
The championship consisted of an eight-team single-elimination tournament. One team qualified as the hosts, four teams qualified as winners of each of the four conferences, one team from each of CW and OUA qualified as conference medalists, and one team from RSEQ qualified based on RSEQ's performance at the previous year's championship.

Teams were permitted a maximum of 18 team personnel in the bench area, up to 11 of which may be named substitutes. Teams were permitted 6 substitutions, along with unlimited at half-time, and if applicable, prior to and at half-time of extra time; reentry of substituted players was allowed. The concussion substitution rule was also in effect.

For the quarter-finals, semi-finals, and final, draws are settled by 30 minutes of extra time and, if required, a penalty shoot-out. For the consolation semi-finals, fifth-place match, and third-place match, draws are settled directly by a penalty shoot-out.

== Teams ==
=== Qualified teams ===
Team	Conf.	Qualified as	Qualified on	Last appearance	Last win
UBC Thunderbirds	CW	Conference champions and hosts (Note: Since hosts UBC were also conference champions, the last Canada West qualification spot went to third place.)	February 27, 2025	2025	2024
Dalhousie Tigers	AUS	Conference champions	November 1, 2026	2024	2000
Ottawa Gee-Gees	OUA	Conference champions	October 31, 2026	2024	2018
Montreal Carabins	RSEQ	Conference champions	October 30, 2026	2025	2025
Thompson Rivers WolfPack	CW	Conference runners-up	November 5, 2026	None	None
Guelph Gryphons	OUA	Conference runners-up	October 31, 2026	2025	None
Laval Rouge et Or	RSEQ	Conference runners-up	October 30, 2026	2025	2016
Trinity Western Spartans	CW	Conference third place	November 6, 2026	2025	2013

=== Seeding ===
Following the conference championships, the eight teams were seeded using the most recent Elo rankings. Each conference champion must have been the highest-seeded team from its conference and must have been seeded in the top six. First-round matchups between the top two qualifiers from the same conference were avoided.

Pos	Conf.	Team	Regular season	Playoffs	Pct
1	CW	UBC Thunderbirds (H)	13–0–1	3–0–0	.971
2	RSEQ	Montreal Carabins	14–0–0	2–0–0	1.000
3	OUA	Ottawa Gee-Gees	11–0–1	3–0–0	.967
4	OUA	Guelph Gryphons	12–0–0	2–1–0	.933
5	AUS	Dalhousie Tigers	8–2–2	2–0–0	.786
6	CW	Trinity Western Spartans	8–4–2	2–1–0	.647
7	CW	Thompson Rivers WolfPack	8–2–4	1–1–1	.676
8	RSEQ	Laval Rouge et Or	8–3–3	1–1–0	.656

Source: U Sports
(H) Host

== Bracket ==
Fifth-place match
UBC Thunderbirds	2
Ottawa Gee-Gees	1

Consolation semi-finals
UBC Thunderbirds	4
Dalhousie Tigers	0
Montreal Carabins	1
Ottawa Gee-Gees	2

Quarter-finals
1	UBC Thunderbirds	1
8	Laval Rouge et Or	2
4	Guelph Gryphons	1
5	Dalhousie Tigers	0
2	Montreal Carabins	0
7	Thompson Rivers WolfPack	1
3	Ottawa Gee-Gees	2
6	Trinity Western Spartans	3

Semi-finals
Laval Rouge et Or	1
Guelph Gryphons	2
Thompson Rivers WolfPack	0
Trinity Western Spartans	1

Final
Guelph Gryphons	2
Trinity Western Spartans	1
Third-place match
Laval Rouge et Or	2
Thompson Rivers WolfPack	1

== Results ==
=== Quarter-finals ===
November 12, 2026
11:00 am

Ottawa Gee-Gees	2–3 (a.e.t.)	Trinity Western Spartans
Gervais 8'; Sun 73'	Report	Sidhu 52'; Watchman 62', 110'

Thunderbird Stadium, Vancouver, BC
Attendance: 1,643
Referee: Laura McNicholas

November 12, 2026
1:30 pm

Montreal Carabins	0–1	Thompson Rivers WolfPack
	Report	Lufo 87'

Thunderbird Stadium, Vancouver, BC
Attendance: 637
Referee: Angelina Baldino

November 12, 2026
4:00 pm

Guelph Gryphons	1–0	Dalhousie Tigers
Trepanier 23'	Report

Thunderbird Stadium, Vancouver, BC
Attendance: 994
Referee: Fatima Morabite

November 12, 2026
6:30 pm

UBC Thunderbirds	1–2	Laval Rouge et Or
Norman 11'	Report	Fortier 71'; Bujold-Samson 86'

Thunderbird Stadium, Vancouver, BC
Attendance: 1,924
Referee: Nava Rajabi

=== Consolation semi-finals ===
November 13, 2026
11:00 am

Montreal Carabins	1–2	Ottawa Gee-Gees
Even 12'	Report	Somers 5'; Mangiaracina 79'

Thunderbird Stadium, Vancouver, BC
Attendance: 1,615
Referee: Fatima Morabite

November 13, 2026
1:30 pm

UBC Thunderbirds	4–0	Dalhousie Tigers
Apps 21'; Rhode 73'; Ferreira 75'; Norman 81'	Report

Thunderbird Stadium, Vancouver, BC
Attendance: 352
Referee: Angelina Baldino

=== Semi-finals ===
November 13, 2026
4:00 pm

Trinity Western Spartans	1–0	Thompson Rivers WolfPack
Sidhu 32'	Report

Thunderbird Stadium, Vancouver, BC
Attendance: 307
Referee: Laura Hall

November 13, 2026
6:30 pm

Guelph Gryphons	2–1	Laval Rouge et Or
Draeger 66'; Trepanier 70'	Report	Lachance 80'

Thunderbird Stadium, Vancouver, BC
Attendance: 124
Referee: Laura McNicholas

=== Fifth-place match ===
November 15, 2026
10:00 am

UBC Thunderbirds	2–1	Ottawa Gee-Gees
Thompson 49'; Bains 59'	Report	Mangiaracina 14'

Thunderbird Stadium, Vancouver, BC
Attendance: 105
Referee: Angelina Baldino

=== Third-place match ===
November 15, 2026
12:30 pm

Thompson Rivers WolfPack	1–2	Laval Rouge et Or
Jolly 85'	Report	Lessard 50', 54'

Thunderbird Stadium, Vancouver, BC
Attendance: 289
Referee: Nava Rajabi

=== Final ===
November 15, 2026
4:00 pm

Guelph Gryphons	2–1	Trinity Western Spartans
Rizakos 25'; Trepanier 63'	Report	Andrews 31'

Thunderbird Stadium, Vancouver, BC
Attendance: 537
Referee: Laura Hall

== See also ==
- 2026 U Sports Men's Soccer Championship
