= Australian rules football in Canada =

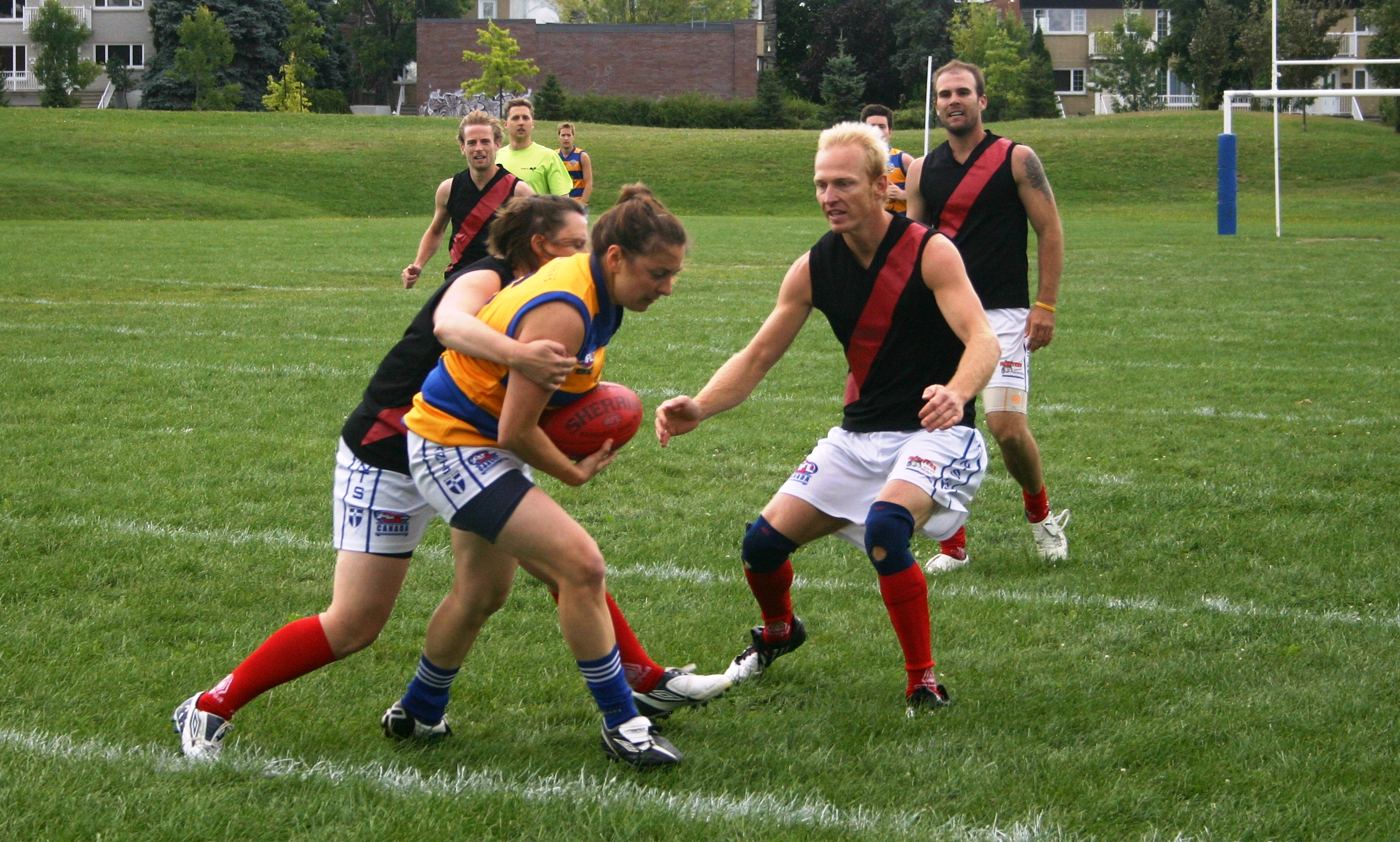
- Action from the 2010 ECAFL Grand Final
- Country: Canada
- Governing body: AFL Canada
- National team: Canada
- Nickname: Northwind
- First played: 1905, Vancouver
- Registered players: 876 (adult); 20,000 (junior)
- Clubs: 41

Club competitions
- Alberta Footy; AFL British Columbia; AFL Ontario; AFL Quebec

Audience records
- Single match: 32,789 (1987). Melbourne v. Sydney (B.C. Place, Vancouver)

Australian rules football in Canada (commonly known as "Aussie Rules" or simply "footy") is played in seven provinces – Ontario, Alberta, Nova Scotia, Newfoundland and Labrador, Quebec, British Columbia and Saskatchewan. The Ontario league, centred on Toronto is a nine-team league, including sides from cities as far afield as Guelph, Hamilton and Ottawa. In western Canada, there are clubs in Edmonton, Calgary and a six-team league in the Vancouver area. There is also a number of junior and women's clubs across Canada.

The sport was first introduced in 1905 in Vancouver, and despite tours involving American and Australian sides in 1912 and 1913, the sport went into permanent recess before World War I as a result of Australia's refusal to recognise Canada as a playing nation. Three-quarters of a century later, the then VFL (now Australian Football League), having briefly gained then lost lucrative North American television broadcasts in the 1980s, attempted to rebuild its audience with a series of exhibition matches between 1987 and 1989. These matches generated significant interest and Canada retains the attendance record for the sport outside of Australia, 32,789 set in 1987 at B.C. Place, Vancouver. As a result of the interest generated the sport was established at the grassroots in 1989 with a competition in Toronto that has continued and expanded to the present. Competition spread from Ontario to other provinces culminating in the establishment of a national governing body, AFL Canada, in 2004. The world governing body, the AFL Commission has recently made great efforts to differentiate it from rugby, producing educational videos such as "What is AFL?" aimed at a North American audience (Video on YouTube).

Canada has hosted the 49th Parallel Cup in 2000 and 2004 (in Toronto), 2007 (Vancouver), 2010 (Toronto), 2013 (Edomonton) and 2022 (Toronto) as well as the 2024 Transatlantic Cup in Toronto. It is home to the only dedicated Australian rules football ground in North America, the Humber College Oval at Colonel Samuel Smith Park in Toronto.

Canadians are increasingly being sought after to play the sport professionally in Australia which has helped to increase overall interest in Canada. Mike Pyke (who successfully switched from international rugby in 2008) featured prominently in red and white during his successful 2012 AFL Grand Final appearance, performing a victory lap with the Canadian flag. Pyke has inspired others to follow and in 2016, Canadians featured prominently in AFL and AFL Women's recruitment with Andrew McGrath being taken as the top pick in the 2016 AFL draft and rugby convert Kendra Heil being picked in the 2016 AFL Women's draft.

Canada's best international results were posted in the 2014 International Cup with men's team, the Northwind, reaching 5th and the women's team, the Northern Lights, being crowned international champions.

== History ==
=== First Establishment: 1904–1911 ===
A request for copies of the Laws of Australian Football by parties from Canada was noted in the Sydney Referee newspaper in 1904. A 1906 report of Australian Football's growth internationally made mention of a Canadian Railway Commissioner early in the century who, while working in Victoria, fell in love with the sport and upon returning to Canada began agitating for it to be played there. He was said to have made several subsequent requests to parties in Australia for support introducing the game.

The game is believed to have been first introduced to British Columbia in 1905, when Canadian-born Captain Robert Nelson Davy of the 6th Regiment began training students of the 101st Canadian Cadet corps in preparation for a planned visit to Australia. The students were from the Vancouver School Board district and included the Vancouver High School Cadet Corps and King Edward High School among others.

Davy wrote to Australia for assistance. However, by 1906 the game's newly formed governing body, the Australasian Football Council (AFC) led by the VFL resolved not to support the game being played outside Australasia and declined any support. West Australian Football League secretary John J Simons however pledged his support through the Young Australia League and began assisting to plan a series of tours between the two countries.

=== Canada vs the United States: 1912 ===
Canadian Schools had been practicing inter-school competition for around 6 years before the arrival of a touring party from the United States including Sydney schoolboy Eric Cullen-Ward, and San Francisco's Columban Park Boys' School in 1912 (who had successfully started Australian rules football in the United States as "field ball" in American schools in 1910). The Americans had come to Vancouver to help prepare Davy's cadets to compete against a touring Young Australia League from Perth scheduled to arrive that year and ultimately to tour Australia as Canada's first national team. They played the first international match between the two countries in 1912 though few if any details of the match survive.

=== Young Australia League tour: 1912 ===
A Young Australia League touring party left for Canada from the United States in January 1912. Though the majority of the trip was funded from Western Australia, the Australasian Football Council pledged £240, with president of the time the VFL's Con Hickey making funding conditional on tour organisers promoting Universal football believing it would have a better chance of catching on in North America. However the West Australians were determined instead that Australian rules be played. The result was that the AFC, led by the VFL withdrew all support for the tour, vowing to ensure that it was not a success.

Following the Young Australian tour the Canadian Cadets team prepared a reciprocal tour of Australia to Sydney, Perth, Fremantle, Kalgoorlie, Adelaide, Ballarat, Tasmania and Melbourne. $11,000 was raised for the tour with a contingent of 60 cadets aged 18 to 20. The Canadians left from Vancouver on 10 July 1912.

=== Controversial Canadian Cadets tour of Australia: 1912–1913 ===
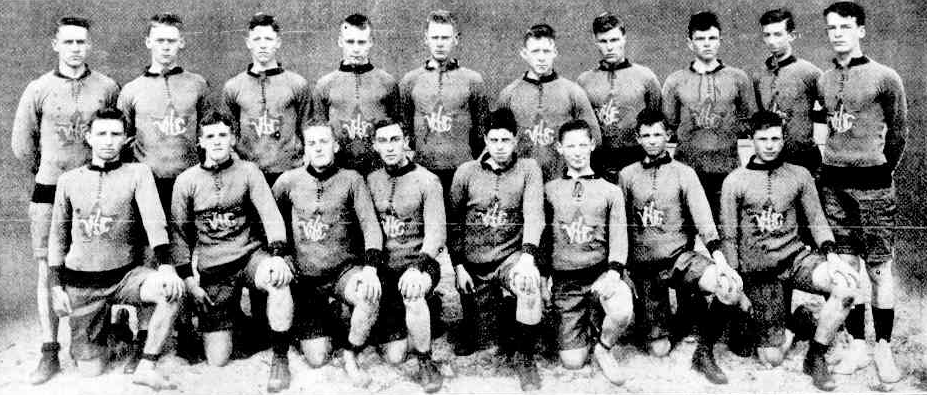
Canadian Cadets Australian Football Team in August 1912

The Canadian Cadets tour was plagued with trouble from the start. Captain Davy had hoped that Australia would extend a similar reception to the one offered the 1909 American Schoolboys team and had intended to play numerous matches across Australia. However, the team was left in the lurch when the AFC refused to recognise the touring party which was not affiliated to it and officially declined participation from Australia's two most powerful leagues, the Victorian Football League and the South Australian Football Association. Like the American tour, it was supported only by Western Australia's Young Australia League and the New South Wales Football Association (NSWAFA).

==== New South Wales ====
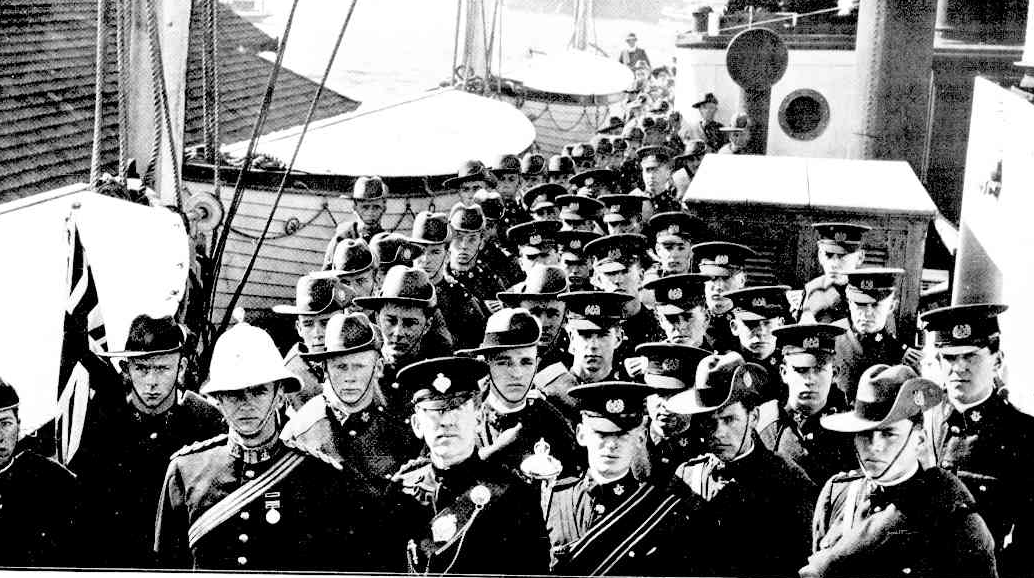
The Canadian Cadets arrived in Sydney on the RMS Zealandia in 1912 to a hostile reception.

A. E. Nash president of the NSWAFA saw it as an opportunity to promote the idea that the game was spreading abroad. This was something that the NSWAFA in particular believed was important to appeal to the Sydney public which had gained enormous interest in representative rugby. The NSWAFA had invested heavily in a thriving schoolboys competition and sending Sydney schoolboy Eric Cullen-Ward to North America had successfully kick-started the code beyond the league's expectations. The AFC led by the VFL however were convinced that the key to converting Sydneysiders was through its promotion of national competition and as a truly national football code featuring its VFL clubs. Much to the chagrin of the touring Canadians and the NSWAFA, the AFC and VFL scheduled a clashing fixture, featuring the Geelong Football Club against the New South Wales state team. However the AFC's exhibition match move backfired and the Queensland vs New South Wales rugby match being played that week dominated Sydney's media attention. The Canadian tour, swept up in anti-VFL sentiment, was afforded the barest of mentions by the media. Canadian tour manager E.R McTaggart made an advanced visit to promote the match only to have the matches postponed due to Australian organisers difficulties scheduling the tour.

The Cadets arrived on HMS Zealandia in Sydney on 4 August. The Canadians expressed disappointment from the notably cold reception in Sydney, described as "a freezer" and complained to the Sydney papers claiming that they were booed by the Sydney public and had even been discriminated against and abused on public transport purely on the basis of their chosen football code. Organisers claimed that the abuse was so bad that at one point the touring party, mostly self-funded, considered returning home. Captain Davy commented that "the people of Canada won't understand this treatment. They will wonder if there is any thing wrong with the boys or with me. We treated the Australian boys who visited us in a very different fashion". Adding insult to injury the NSWAFA public statement on behalf of the Sydney public placed the blame on the Australasian Football Council and the visiting Canadians. Despite the NSWAFA's "apology" the Government of New South Wales offered a formal apology and refunded the expenses while visiting the state. Officials from Newcastle and Goulburn made a concerted effort to atone for Sydney's hostile reception for the scheduled visits however the matches were abandoned due to state of the football grounds. The Sydney matches themselves were low key events, and were rescheduled several times during and there was much difficulty securing grounds to play from rugby authorities. Reportedly skills, particularly bouncing the ball, let the touring side down, though they were competitive against the Australians.

Tour Date	Location	Result
7 August 1912	Sydney Football Ground, Sydney	Canada 2.9 (21) def. by New South Wales schoolboys 8.12 (60)
10 August 1912	Sydney Football Ground, Sydney	Canada 4.12 (38) def. by New South Wales schoolboys 8.8 (56)

==== Victoria ====
In contrast to the New South Wales tour, the cadets received a parade in Melbourne and a full page welcoming in The Argus. However they faced a stern lack of support from Victorian football authorities, the cadets who had trained to play in the home of football, instead competed and lost in other sports including lacrosse at the Melbourne Cricket Ground. A rare exception was during the visit to Newport a local amateur team agreed to play an unsanctioned match and were completely shocked to have been soundly beaten by the visitors.

Tour Date	Location	Result
27 August 1912	Newport, Victoria	Canada 6.0 (36) def Newport 2.0 (12)

==== Western Australia ====
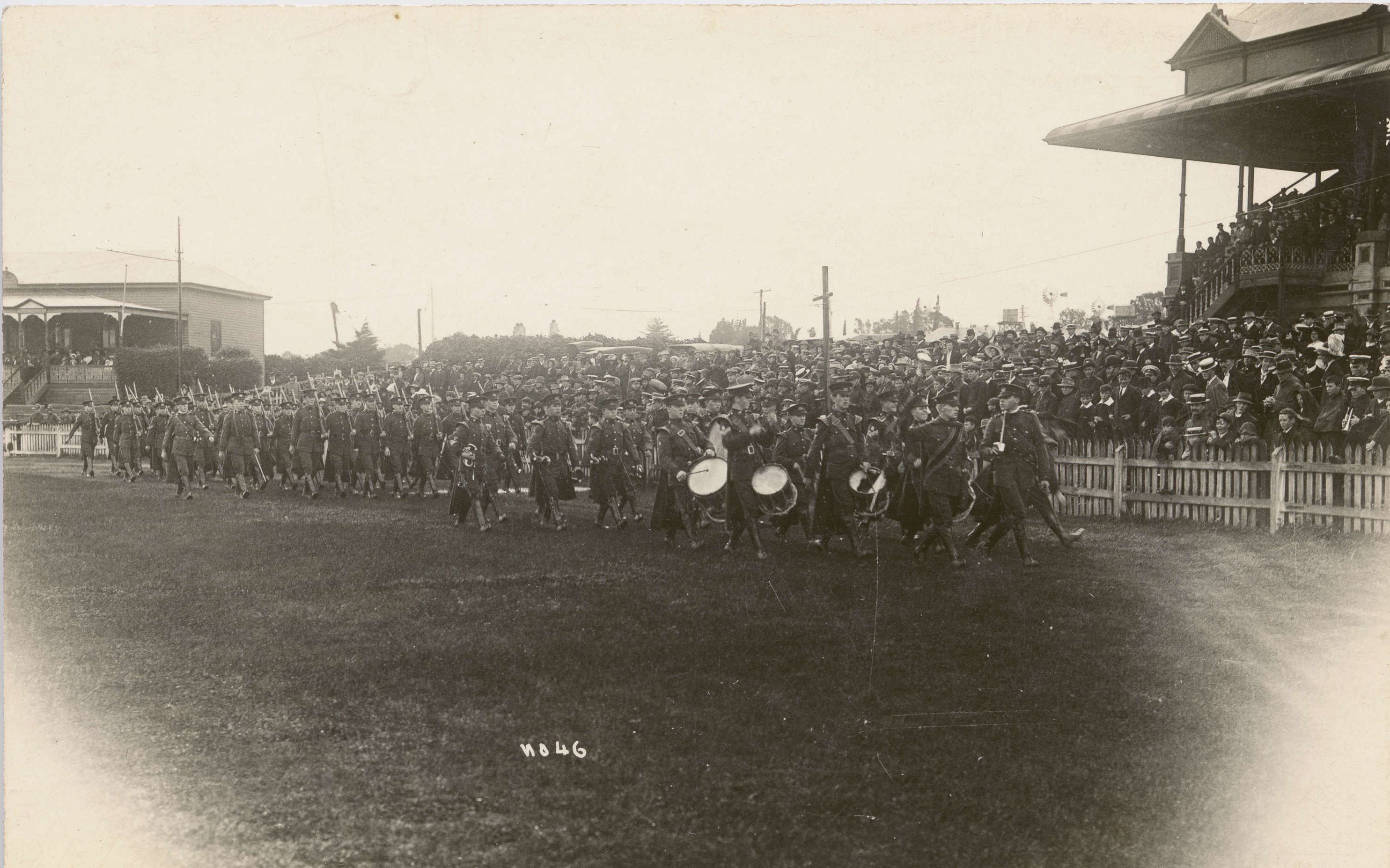
Part of the pre-match marching ceremony at the WACA Ground

The Canadians went on to Western Australia where they were greeted with much fanfare and were hosted by the WAFL (who had sponsored the Young Australia League) where they would play several matches and with the experience gathered on the tour, displayed much improved performance. In Perth, the West Australian Football League organised a match featuring the Young Australia League Matches in West Australia drew by far the largest attendances of the Australian tour.

11 September 1912	Perth Oval, Perth, Western Australia	Canada 5.5 def. by Young Australia League 7.3
11 September 1912	Perth Oval, Perth, Western Australia	Canada 3.7 def 88th Cadets (East Perth) 0.4
	Christian Brothers College, Fremantle	Canada 7.3 def Christian Brothers College 3.10
		Canada 2.0 def. by Goldfields 8.0
		Canada 2.8 drew Busselton 2.8
	Christian Brothers College, Fremantle	Canada 7.5 def Christian Brothers College 4.7
1 October 1912	Midland Junction	Canada 5.8 defeated Kendall 3.3

=== Australia declines support and demise of the game: 1914–1919 ===
Upon returning to Vancouver, the game continued be played with the Vancouver School Board thanking the hospitality of the local leagues in Western Australia, but critical of the Australasian Football Council who had refused support it, and just prior to World War I extending an invitation for another tour from the Young Australia League. Following the North American tour from and to Australia, the AFC demanded that the West Australian Football Association stop all of its financial subsidies of international football, which it did in 1913.

There were reports that despite the failed tour the sport continued to be played in the high schools at least until the war though the Vancouver Board began increasingly playing rugby after the successful 1912 Vancouver rugby tour against Stanford Rugby in the United States.

A proposal was debated by the Australasian Football Council in 1915 of a tour to Canada, with a decision deferred until after the war.

Canada was never granted membership to the council and the game appears to have died out there during World War I.

=== Exhibition matches and revival: 1987–1989 ===
In the late 1980s, TSN broadcasts in Canada showed highlights of the Victorian Football League from Australia. However the league's once lucrative North American broadcast rights dried up and in response it initiated a series of exhibition matches between 1987 and 1989 in an attempt to rebuild its audience.

The first major exhibition matches in Canada attracted three of the largest crowds for the sport in the world, along with much interest. The 1987 game holds the record for a VFL/AFL match held outside Australia.

Year	Location	Stadium	Teams	Result	Attendance	Notes	Media
1987	Vancouver	BC Place	Melbourne v. North Melbourne	Melbourne 19.13 (127) def. North Melbourne 16.15 (111)	7,980	15-a-side Fosters World Challenge match	Video on YouTube
1987	Vancouver	BC Place	Melbourne v. Sydney	Melbourne 20.19 (139) def. Sydney 12.9 (81)	32,789	Fosters World Challenge match	Video on YouTube
1988	Toronto	Varsity Stadium	Collingwood v. Hawthorn	Collingwood 18.11 (119) def. Hawthorn 15.15 (105)	18,571	Fosters Cup Final	Video on YouTube
1989	Toronto	Toronto Skydome	Geelong v. Melbourne	Melbourne 14.19 (103) def. Geelong 13.12 (90)	24,639	Fosters Cup	Video on YouTube

=== Local development and the Canadian Australian Football Association: 1989–1993 ===
The Canadian Australian Football Association was established in May 1989 when two clubs, the Mississauga Mustangs and the Toronto Panthers were formed and played in the inaugural Conacher Cup game in Toronto, Ontario. Since then, the game of Australian football in Canada has expanded considerably nationwide.

In 1990, the Scarborough Rebels, the North York Hawks and the Hamilton Wildcats joined, with the Balmy Beach Saints coming on board in 1992. The North York Hawks later relocated and became known as the Broadview Hawks.

The Brampton Wolverines, the league's seventh team, were formed in 1993. The Scarborough Rebels relocated and became the Lawrence Park Rebels.

=== Canada gains a national team: 1993–2002 ===
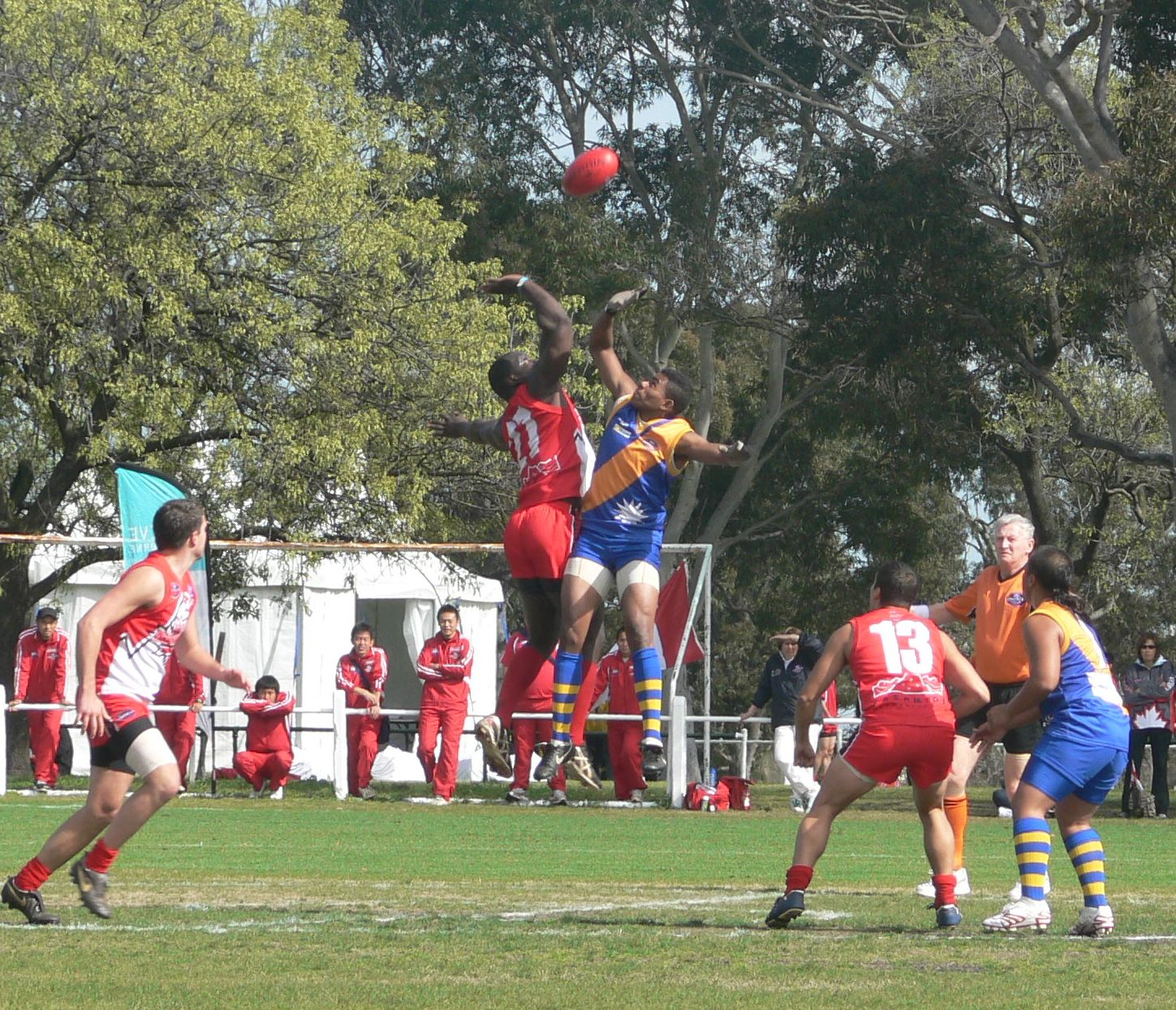
Canada take on Nauru in the 2008 International Cup

In 1993, a Canadian representative team, known as the Northwind, beat a British (BARFL) representative team.

In 1994 and 1995, the Canadians again defeated the British at home.

In 1995, several local CAFA games were broadcast on a Hamilton cable television channel.

In July 1995, the Hamilton Wildcats played a Canadian All-Star team in front of 21,000 fans during the half-time break at a Canadian Football League (gridiron) match.

In 1999, the first USA v Canada game was played (49th Parallel Cup, named after the 49th parallel north). The Revolution narrowly defeated Team Canada (Northwind). Later matches enforced strict rules based on player origins. The 49th Parallel Cup is held every two years.

In 2002, Canada participated in the inaugural Australian Football International Cup, with Canada represented by the Northwind team consisting purely of Canadian-born players. The Canadian national team has competed in every International Cup since its inception and now competes with its national women's team named the Northern Lights.

=== Continued grassroots growth and the emergence of AFL Canada: 2003– ===
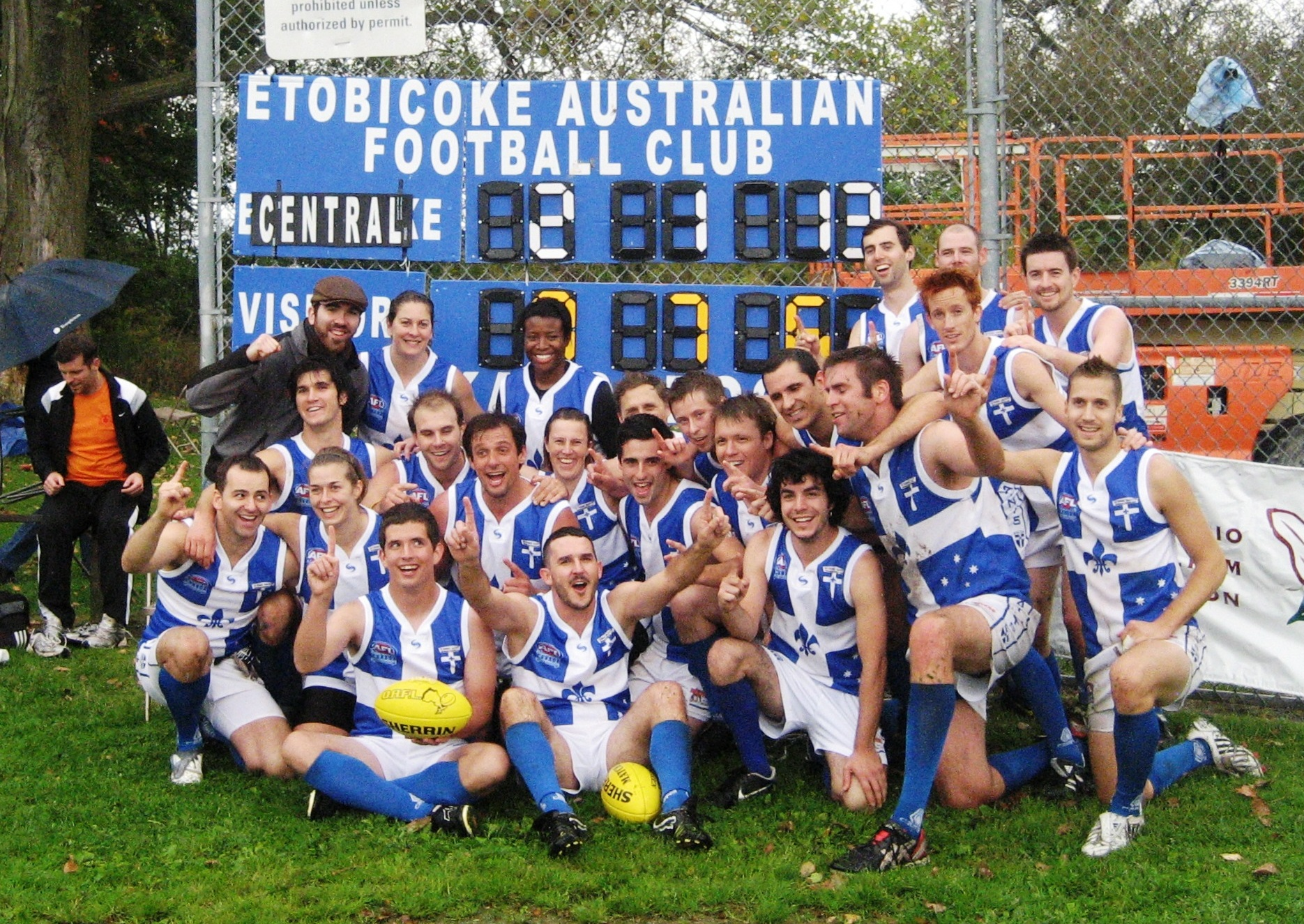
Quebec Saints, 2010 premiers

In 2003, the first junior league in Canada, the North Delta Junior Australian Football League, was formed.

AFL Canada was formed as governing body on 30 July 2004, when the Canadian Australian Football League changed its official name. The move corresponded with funding from the Australian Football League, and a junior participation program was put in place. The clubs were split into two regional leagues, the Ontario Australian Football League and the North West Pacific Football League. The remaining Alberta-based clubs participate in AFL Canada organised regional conferences such as the British Columbia Cup.

In 2005, the Northwind participated in the 2005 International Cup.

In early 2006, AFL Canada sent a small delegation to the AFL exhibition match in Los Angeles. London and Windsor folded due to distance but the new OAFL club, the Central Blues, formed and began competing. In Alberta, the Calgary Bears also formed and the Westcoast challenge commenced.

In early 2007, the Ottawa Swans formed, and affiliated with the OAFL, and the Demons relocated from Mississauga to High Park in Toronto.

In late 2007, AFL Canada hosted the Ironbark challenge, including the 49th Parallel Cup between Canada vs United States, including historic first women's and junior (under 17) tests between the two countries. Canada defeated the United States for the first time at both senior and junior level, but were soundly defeated in the women's match. The tournament also included a touring Japanese team and attracted a record attendance of 2,500 at Thunderbird Stadium in Vancouver.

== Notable players with connections to Canada ==
Several professional and international players have strong connections to Canada.

In early 2008, junior Northwind representative Scott Fleming moved to Australia to play with the Broadbeach Cats semi-professional club in the AFL Queensland State League at 17 years of age.

Later the same year, former Canadian rugby union international Mike Pyke was signed by the Sydney Swans AFL team as an international rookie at 24 years of age.

Andrew McGrath, who was born in Canada, was drafted first overall in the 2016 AFL draft by Essendon.

Kendra Heil signed with Collingwood of AFL Women's in 2017.

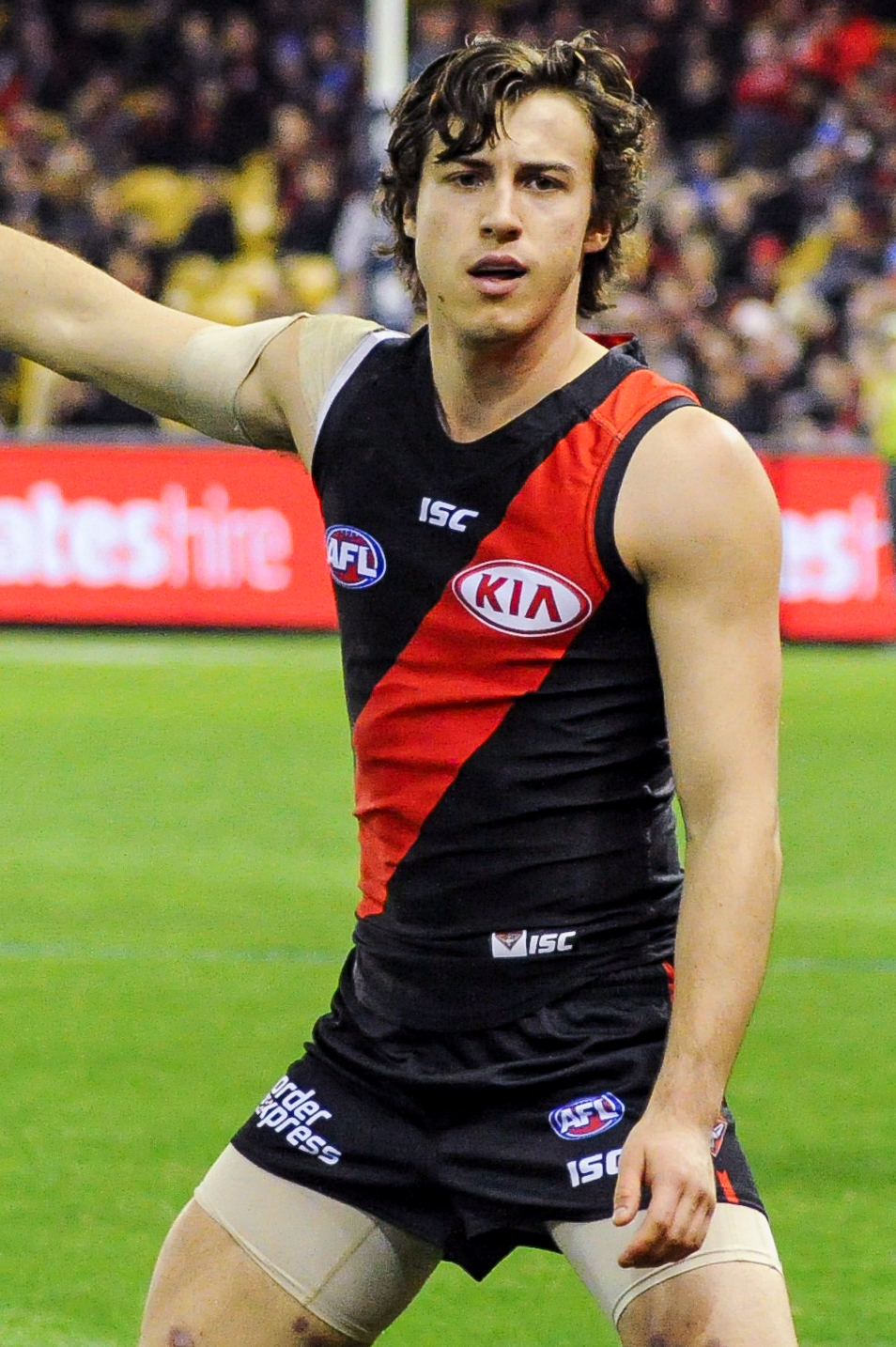
Andrew McGrath, Canadian born Essendon Football Club No. 1 AFL draft pick

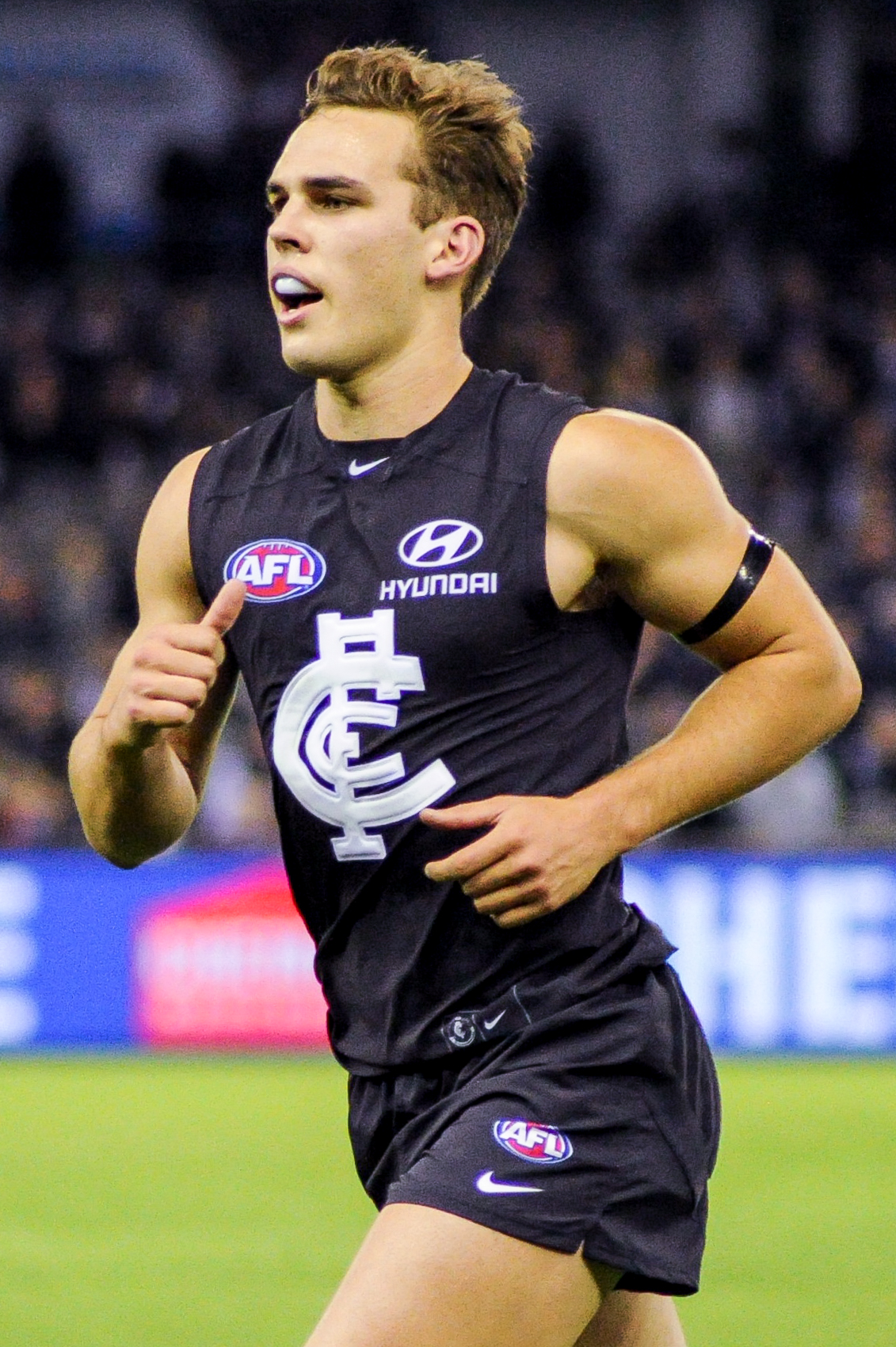
David Cuningham

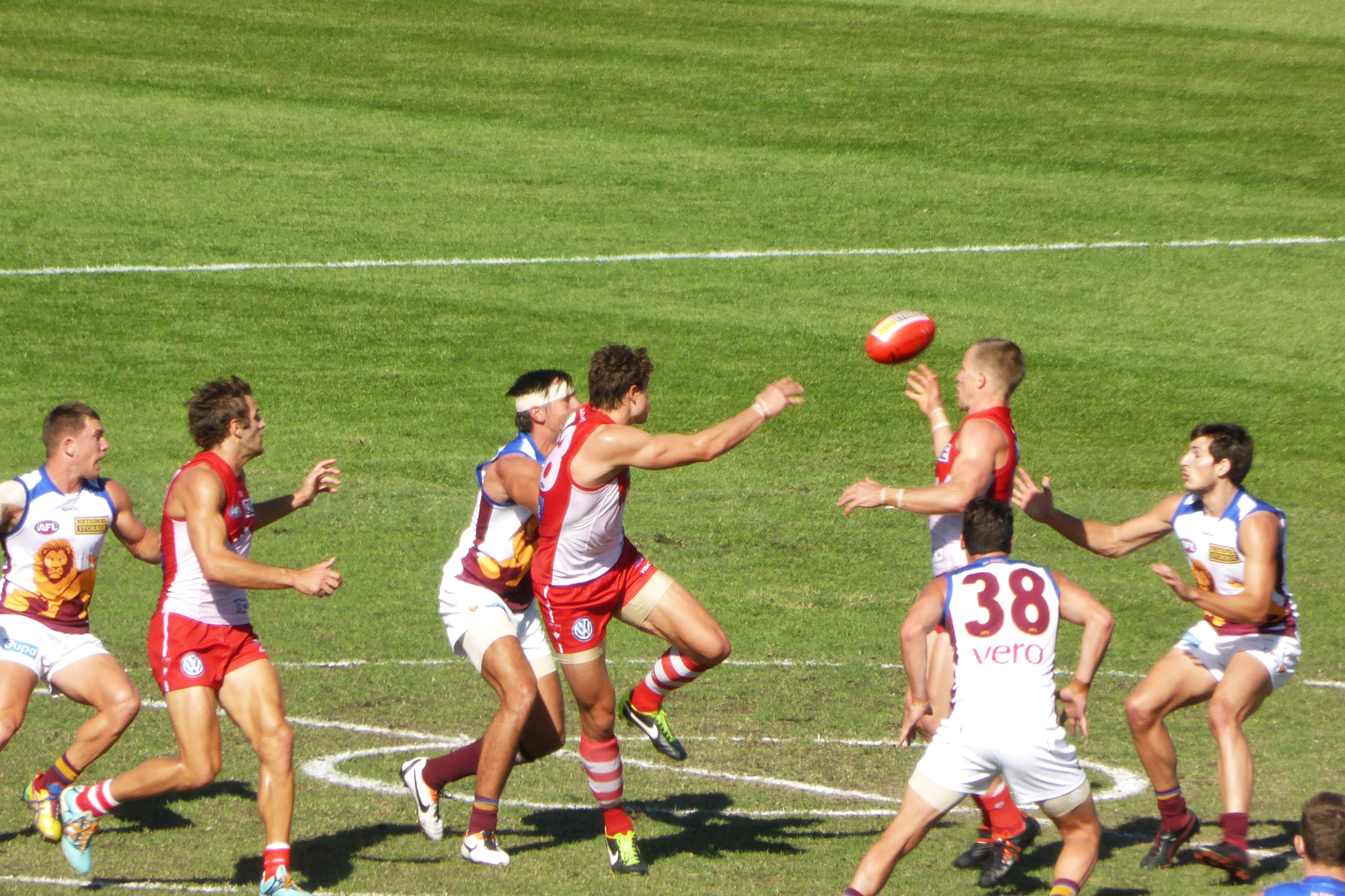
Mike Pyke, Canadian born Sydney Swans premiership player and former Canada (rugby) representative

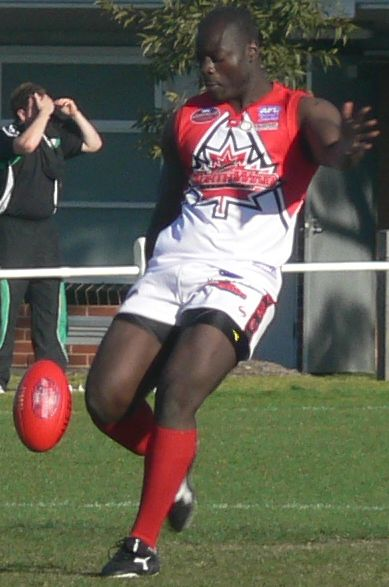
Emmanuel "Manny" Mattata, Northwind national team, 2008 World XVII member and Etobicoke Kangaroos player

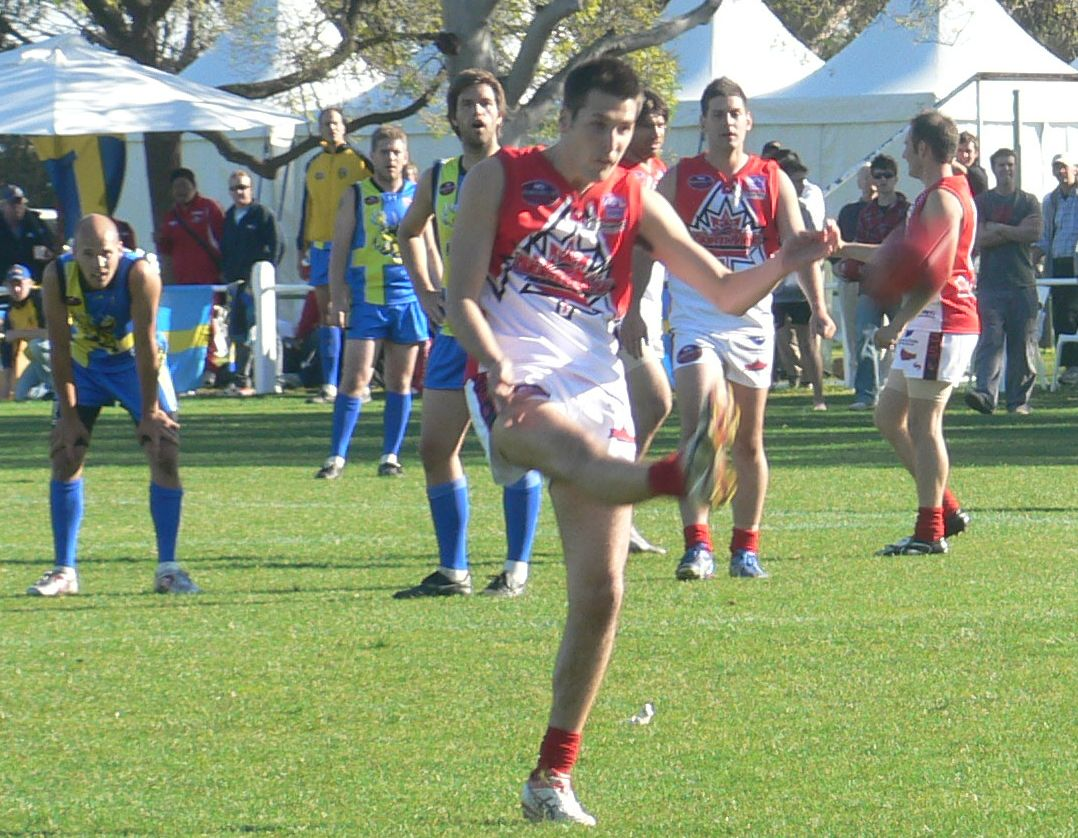
Scott Fleming, Northwind, Broadbeach Cats and 2008 World XVII member
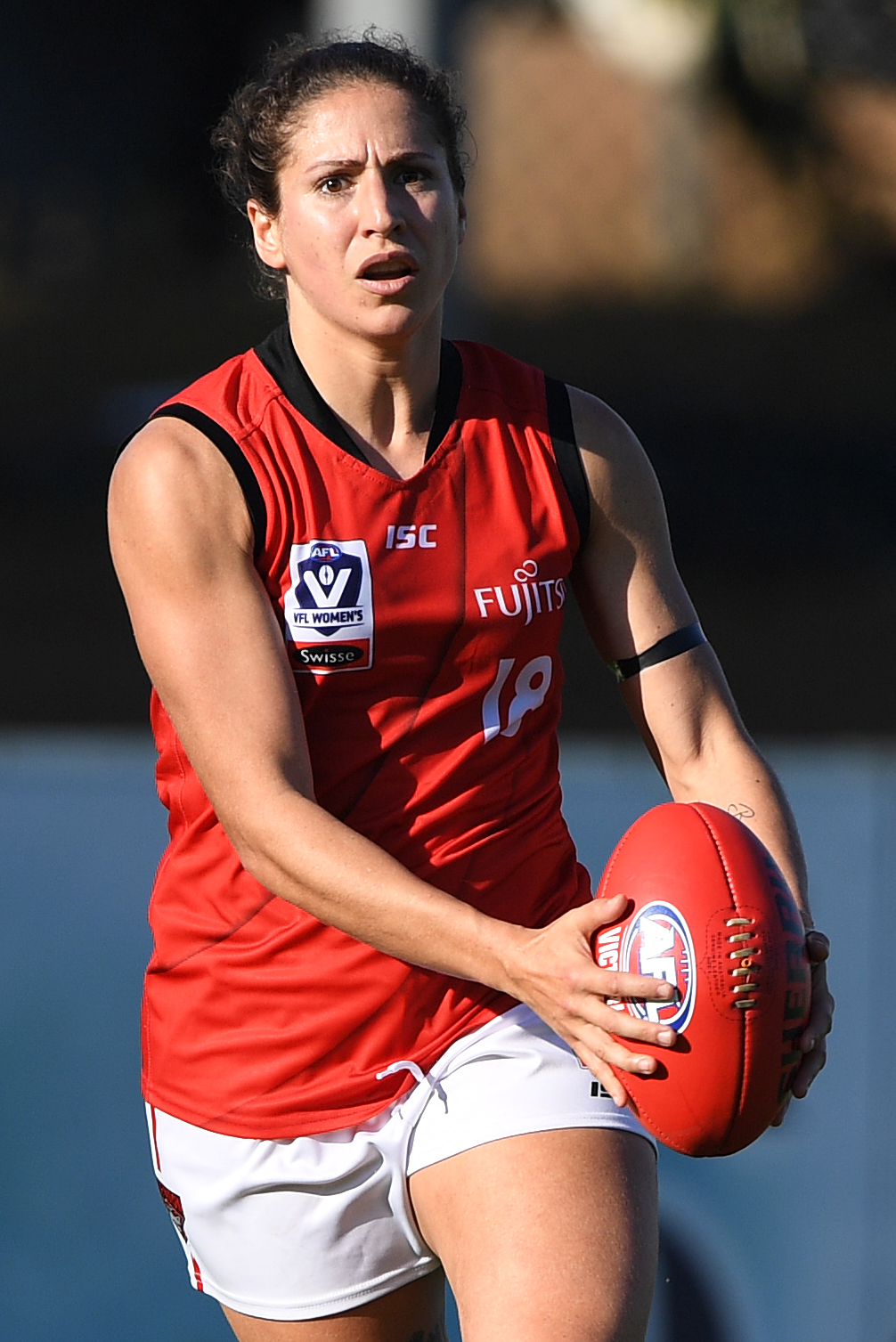
Kendra Heil, Canadian born Collingwood Football Club (AFLW), Essendon Football Club (VFLW) and Northern Lights national team player

Currently on an AFL club list

Player	Connections to Canada, References	AFL Years*	AFL Matches*	AFL Goals*	Notes
Cameron Mackenzie	Mother	2023–	14	3	
Andrew McGrath	Born in Mississauga, Ontario to Canadian parents	2016–	103	18	No. 1 2016 AFL draft
David Cuningham	Parent	2016–	38	20	No. 23 2016 AFL draft
Harley Balic	Parent	2016–2018	4	3	No. 38 2015 AFL draft
Mike Pyke	Born and raised in Victoria, British Columbia by Canadian parents	2009–2015	110	48	No. 57 2009 AFL Rookie Draft (Former Canadian rugby international)

Currently on an AFLW club list

Player	Connections to Canada, References	AFLW Years*	AFLW Matches*	AFLW Goals*	Notes
Tunisha Kikoak	Father (Inuit from Inuvik)	2024–	8	5	
Ellie Hampson	Parent	2020–	23	5	Pre-list 2019 AFLW draft
Kendra Heil	From Simcoe, Ontario	2016	–	–	2016 AFLW draft (free agent) Collingwood Football Club (AFLW), Essendon Football Club (VFLW) and Northern Lights national team player

=== World XVIII members ===
==== Men's World XVIII ====
- Eric Klein (2017)
- Scott Fleming (2008)
- Emmanuel Mattata (2008)
- Stefan Leyhane (2002)
- Steve Rutledge
- Rob McEwan
- Paul Loghanne

==== Women's World XVIII ====
- Valerie Moreau
- Lara Hilmi
- Aimee Legault
- Nicola Kirwan
- Hilary Perry

== Governing body ==
The governing body for Aussie Rules in Canada is AFL Canada.

== National team ==
Team Canada for men is known as the Northwind. Team Canada for women is known as the Northern Lights.

== Participation ==
In 2019, there were a total of 875 registered senior players in organised competitions across 41 clubs with more than 20,000 junior registrations.

Participation has more than doubled since 2006, when there were over 420 senior (approximately 250 Canadian national) Australian rules football players in Canada out of a total of 484, an increase of 25% from 2005. By the end of 2007, this figure had increased to a total of 825 players in organised competitions across 21 clubs, of which 525 were senior and 300 were junior, an increase of over 70% from 2006, and a total of 95% increase over 2 years.

== Women's football ==
Canada boasts 9 women's football clubs nationwide. Youth girls development programs operate in Alberta, British Columbia, Ontario and Quebec. The national team, formed in 2007, is known as the "Northern Lights". They were formerly known as the "Eagles". They played in the first women's international footy matches during 2007, when they lost twice to the USA Freedom. In 2011 the national women's team competed in the inaugural women's division of the Australian Football International Cup, where they came second to Ireland. In 2014 the Northern lights became world champions when they defeated the Irish Banshees at the AFL International Cup. In 2015 the Northern Lights defeated the USA Freedom to win the annual 49th Parallel Cup.

== Representative teams ==
Club	Colours	Nickname	League
Alberta			AFL Alberta
Ontario			AFL Ontario
Nova Scotia		Pirates	AFL Atlantic
Quebec		Saints*	AFL Quebec

*The AFL Quebec women's representative team was known as the Montreal Angels from 2009 to 2019.

== Leagues and clubs ==
Cities with Australian Rules Football clubs across Canada

=== AFL Atlantic (New Brunswick/Nova Scotia/Prince Edward Island) ===
==== Current ====
Club	Colours	Nickname	Home Ground	Est.	Years in AAFL	AAFL premierships	
Club	Colours	Nickname	Home Ground	Est.	Years in AAFL	Total	Years
Cape Breton		Giants	Open Hearth Park, Sydney	2015	2015-	0	-
Cornwall		Tigers	Terry Fox Sports Complex, Cornwall	2025	2025-	0	-
Halifax		Dockers	Graves-Oakley Memorial Park, Halifax	2013	2014-	2	2024, 2025
Saint John		Bulldogs	UNBSJ Canada Games Stadium, Saint John	2024	2024-	0	-

==== Former ====
Club	Colours	Nickname	Home Ground	Est.	Years in AAFL	AAFL premierships		Fate
Club	Colours	Nickname	Home Ground	Est.	Years in AAFL	Total	Years	Fate
St John's		Puffins	Teakwood Drive Park, St John's	2015	2015-2019	0	-	Folded after 2019 season

=== Alberta ===
==== Representative teams ====
Club	Colours	Nickname	Home Ground	Est.	League
Calgary		Kangaroos	A E Cross High School Oval, Calgary	2002	USAFL

==== Current ====
Club	Colours	Nickname	Home Ground	Est.
Bears		Bears	A E Cross High School Oval, Calgary	2007
Cowboys		Cowboys	A E Cross High School Oval, Calgary	2008
Edmonton		Wombats	Kaskitayo Park, Edmonton	2009

==== Former ====
Club	Colours	Nickname	Home Ground	Est.
Wolves		Wolves	A E Cross High School Oval, Calgary	2015

==== Current ====
Club	Colours	Nickname	Home Ground	Est.
Calgary Kookaburras		Kookaburras	A E Cross High School Oval, Calgary	2007
Edmonton		Emus	Kaskitayo Park, Edmonton	2009

==== Former ====
Club	Colours	Nickname	Home Ground	Est.
Hillhurst		Nighthawks		2008
Kensington		Kingfishers		2008

=== British Columbia ===
==== British Columbia Australian Football League ====
===== Current =====
Club	Colours	Nickname	Home Ground	Est.	Years in BCAFL	Notes
Burnaby/Seattle	(Burnaby)(Seattle)	Eagles/Bears	Burnaby Lakes Sports Complex, Burnaby, British Columbia and Lake Stevens Community Fields, Lake Stevens, Washington	2001	2001-	Joint team between Burnaby and Seattle
Vancouver		Cougars	Burnaby Lakes Sports Complex, Burnaby	2001	2001-	
Vancouver-Whistler		Hawks	Burnaby Lakes Sports Complex, Burnaby	2009	2009-	
West Coast Saints		Saints	Burnaby Lakes Sports Complex, Burnaby	2008	2008-	Do not field women's team

==== Former ====
Club	Colours	Nickname	Home Ground	Est.	Years in BCAFL	Fate
Victoria		Sharks		2016	2016-2021	Folded after 2021 season

==== North Delta Junior Australian Football League ====
Club	City	Province	Founded	Years in existence
North Delta Junior Australian Football League	North Delta	British Columbia	2003	2003-2021

=== Ontario ===
==== AFL Ontario Men's competition ====
Club	Colours	Nickname	Home Ground	Est.	Years in OAFL	Premierships	
Club	Colours	Nickname	Home Ground	Est.	Years in OAFL	Total	Years
Grand River (Guelph 2001-2013)		Gargoyles	Margaret Greene Park, Guelph	2001	2001-	0	-
Hamilton		Wildcats	Mohawk Sports Oval, Hamilton	1990	1990-	1	2022
High Park (Mississauga 1989-2006) (Folded, merged with Brampton Bulldogs to survive)		Demons	Humber College Australian Football Field, Toronto	1989	1989-	1	1994
Ottawa		Swans	Manotick Polo Field, Kars	2007	2008-	2	2018, 2019
Toronto Dingos		Dingos	Humber College Australian Football Field, Toronto	1996	1996-	5	2000, 2003, 2004, 2005, 2026
Toronto Eagles		Eagles	Humber College Australian Football Field, Toronto	1989	1989-	12	1989, 1990, 1991, 1995, 1996, 1997, 1998, 1999, 2017
Toronto Rebels (Scarborough 1990-92; Lawrence Park 1993-2004; Lakeshore 2005-07)		Rebels	Humber College Australian Football Field, Toronto	1990	1990-	7	1992, 1993, 2001, 2016, 2023, 2024, 2025
Central Blues		Blues	Humber College Australian Football Field, Toronto	2006	2006-2023	1	2010
Broadview Hawks		Hawks	Humber College Australian Football Field, Toronto	1990	1990-2017	2	2013, 2014
Etobicoke Kangaroos		Roos	Humber College Australian Football Field, Toronto	2004	2004-2022	4	2008, 2011, 2012, 2015

==== AFL Ontario Women's competition ====
Club	Colours	Nickname	Location/Home Ground	Est.	Years in OAFL	Premierships	
Club	Colours	Nickname	Location/Home Ground	Est.	Years in OAFL	Total	Most recent
Etobicoke		Kangaroos	Humber College Australian Football Field, Toronto	2003	2011-	5	2015, 2016, 2017, 2018, 2022
Hamilton		Wildcats	Mohawk Sports Oval, Hamilton	1990	2012-	2	2021, 2023
High Park		Demons	Humber College Australian Football Field, Toronto	1989	2012-	2	2012, 2013
Ottawa		Swans	Manotick Polo Field, Kars	2007	2012-2014, 2018-	2	2014, 2024
Toronto Central Blues		Blues	Humber College Australian Football Field, Toronto	2005	2011-	0	-

=== AFL Quebec ===
==== Men's ====
Club	Colours	Nickname	City	Est.	Years in QAFL	Premierships	
Club	Colours	Nickname	City	Est.	Years in QAFL	Total	Years
Montréal		Demons	Montréal	2018	2012-	4	2016, 2017, 2019, 2025
Montréal City		Blues	Montréal	2018	2018-	3	2021, 2022, 2023
Old Montréal		Dockers	Montréal	2012	2012-	2	2018, 2024

==== Women's ====
Club	Colours	Nickname	City	Est.	Years in QAFL	Premierships	
Club	Colours	Nickname	City	Est.	Years in QAFL	Total	Years
Notre-Dame-de-Grace (N.D.G)		Giants	Montréal	2014	2014-	2	2014, 2023
Montréal City		Blues	Montréal	2018	2018-	1	2024

== Major tournaments ==
=== Domestic ===
- West Coast Challenge
- BC Cup

=== International ===
- 49th Parallel Cup
- Australian Football International Cup

== Audience ==
=== Television ===
TV coverage of the AFL in Canada has historically included the weekly highlights program going back to the 1980s. In the mid-1990s when ESPN briefly reacquired the rights to the AFL in US again (due to lobbying by fans associated with AFANA), the sport first appeared on The Sports Network, better known as TSN. In succeeding years, the sport moved between several networks but was primarily on TSN. Coverage remained limited to highlights programs save for one time each year, where the Grand Final (championship game) was usually live. In 2006, due to growing demand and lobbying by AFANA for regular live coverage, the new Setanta Sports acquired rights in both Canada and the USA. In mid-season that year, live matches began appearing regularly on television in Canada for the first time on Setanta Sports (STS). When Setanta's North American operations failed in August 2010, the sport briefly moved to Rogers Sportsnet. Following ESPN winning the rights once again in the US, the sport returned to TSN, where it remains. TSN now airs one live match and one delayed match each round of the AFL season, both available in HD. For many years, fans in extreme western Canada have been able to see coverage via mid-size or large satellite dishes able to catch signals low on the horizon intended for the Pacific via first Australia TV and now by its successor Australia Plus. AFANA provides listings of Canadian TV schedules on its web site along with information on the coverage.

In 2011, the first televised all-Canadian Aussie Rules match was shown on Rogers TV, and featured the Ottawa Swans hosting the Toronto Rebels.

In 2017, they began broadcasting Canada's national teams

=== Attendance records ===
==== Exhibition matches ====
Canada holds the world record for attendance at a match outside Australia.

- 32,789 (1987). Melbourne v. North Melbourne (B.C. Place, Vancouver)

==== International tests ====
- 2,500 (2007). 49th Parallel Cup. Canada vs United States. Thunderbird Stadium, Vancouver
