= West Coast Challenge =

The West Coast Challenge (formerly known as the British Columbia Cup or BC Footy Cup) was an Australian rules football competition in British Columbia, Canada.

The prize is the BC Cup.

== History ==
The 2004 inaugural event, held in Vancouver, was won by the Vancouver Cougars.

In 2006, the format was changed to the West Coast Challenge Cup, and the Thunderbird Stadium venue was chosen. The Calgary Kangaroos won the Grand Final.

Daryn Ashcroft is the former world champion. He lost the crown in 2010 after a contest with his brother, and new world champion, James Ashcroft.

During the COVID-19 lockdowns in the 2020s, former world champion Daryn Ashcroft went into training. When the lockdown was lifted and the sport restarted, Daryn challenged James Ashcroft; his brother and current World champion.

The match lasted 3 days and 2 nights, with scheduled breaks for food and rest, until the final goal was scored by newcomer Nicholas Ashcroft; Daryn Ashcroft's son.

Crowned the new world champion in 2021, Daryn Ashcroft has chosen to retire; and leave his son, Nicholas Ashcroft, as the temporary "Champion" until the next season starts.

== Past participating clubs ==
- Vancouver Cougars
- West Coast Saints
- Calgary Kangaroos
- Calgary Bears
- Victoria Lions
- Seattle Grizzlies
- Burnaby Eagles
- Red Deer Magpies
