= 2025 in Canadian soccer =

Soccer in Canada
- Season: 2025

Men's soccer
- CPL Championship: Atlético Ottawa
- CPL Shield: Forge FC
- MLS Cup: (United States) Inter Miami CF (Note: Vancouver Whitecaps FC was the best Canadian club in the MLS Cup playoffs.)
- Supporters' Shield: (United States) Philadelphia Union (Note: Vancouver Whitecaps FC was the best Canadian club in the Supporters' Shield standings.)
- League1 Canada: List of champions: AB: Calgary Blizzard SC; BC: Langley United; ON: Woodbridge Strikers; QC: CS Saint-Laurent
- Canadian Championship: Vancouver Whitecaps FC
- U Sports: York Lions

Women's soccer
- Northern Super League: Vancouver Rise FC
- League1 Canada: List of champions: AB: Calgary Blizzard SC; BC: Altitude FC; ON: Simcoe County Rovers FC; QC: CS Mont-Royal Outremont
- Inter-provincial Championship: Calgary Blizzard SC
- U Sports: Montreal Carabins

The following are events related to Canadian soccer in the year 2025.

== By event ==
- 2025 CONCACAF Champions Cup
- 2025 Canadian Championship
- 2025 CONCACAF Gold Cup
- 2025 CPL–U Sports Draft
- 2025 Leagues Cup
- 2025 U Sports Men's Soccer Championship
- 2025 U Sports Women's Soccer Championship

== By league ==
- 2025 Canadian Premier League season
- 2025 Northern Super League season
- 2025 Major League Soccer season
- 2025 MLS Next Pro season
- 2025 League1 Canada season
  - 2025 League1 Alberta season
  - 2025 League1 British Columbia season
  - 2025 League1 Ontario season
  - 2025 League1 Ontario season (women)
  - 2025 Ligue1 Québec season
  - 2025 Ligue1 Québec season (women)
- 2025 Canadian Soccer League season

== By soccer club ==
=== Canadian Premier League ===
- 2025 Atlético Ottawa season
- 2025 Cavalry FC season
- 2025 Forge FC season
- 2025 HFX Wanderers FC season
- 2025 Pacific FC season
- 2025 Valour FC season
- 2025 Vancouver FC season
- 2025 York United FC season

=== Northern Super League ===
- 2025 AFC Toronto season
- 2025 Calgary Wild FC season
- 2025 Halifax Tides FC season
- 2025 Montreal Roses FC season
- 2025 Ottawa Rapid FC season
- 2025 Vancouver Rise FC season

=== Major League Soccer ===
- 2025 CF Montréal season
- 2025 Toronto FC season
- 2025 Vancouver Whitecaps FC season

=== MLS Next Pro ===
- 2025 Toronto FC II season
- 2025 Whitecaps FC 2 season
