= 2027 U Sports Men's Soccer Championship =

Tournament details
- Country: Canada
- Cities: Edmonton, Alberta
- Venue: Foote Field
- Dates: November 11–14, 2027
- Teams: 8

The 2027 U Sports Men's Soccer Championship will be the 55th edition of the U Sports men's soccer championship, a postseason tournament to determine the national champion of the 2027 U Sports men's soccer season. The tournament will be played November 11–14, 2027 at Foote Field and hosted by the University of Alberta.

== Host ==
The tournament will be held at Foote Field by the University of Alberta. This will be the fourth U Sports men's soccer championship hosted by the University of Alberta, having previously hosted in 1979, 1981, and 2006.

== Qualified teams ==
The championship will consist of an eight-team single-elimination tournament. One team automatically qualified as the hosts, four teams automatically qualify as winners of each of the four conferences, and the three non-hosting conferences will each be assigned an additional berth.

=== Participating teams ===
Team	Conf.	Qualified as	Qualified on	Last appearance	Last win
Alberta Golden Bears	CW	Hosts (Note: If Alberta wins the Canada West championship, the Canada West runners-up will qualify as well.)	September 15, 2026	2026	2016
TBD	AUS	Conference champions			
TBD	CW	Conference champions			
TBD	OUA	Conference champions			
TBD	RSEQ	Conference champions			
TBD	AUS	Conference runners-up			
TBD	OUA	Conference runners-up			
TBD	RSEQ	Conference regular season winners			

=== Seeding ===
After the conference championships, the four conference champions will be seeded in positions one through four based on their final ranking. The remaining four teams will then be placed in the bracket to avoid intraconference matchups in the first two rounds and to avoid pairs of matchups from similar conferences.

== Bracket ==
Fifth-place match

Consolation semi-finals

Quarter-finals
1
8
4
5
2
7
3
6

Semi-finals

Final
Third-place match

== Results ==
=== Quarter-finals ===
November 11, 2027

v

Foote Field, Edmonton, AB
November 11, 2027

v

Foote Field, Edmonton, AB
November 11, 2027

v

Foote Field, Edmonton, AB
November 11, 2027

v

Foote Field, Edmonton, AB

=== Consolation semi-finals ===
November 12, 2027

v

Foote Field, Edmonton, AB
November 12, 2027

v

Foote Field, Edmonton, AB

=== Semi-finals ===
November 12, 2027

v

Foote Field, Edmonton, AB
November 12, 2027

v

Foote Field, Edmonton, AB

=== Fifth-place match ===
November 13, 2027

v

Foote Field, Edmonton, AB

=== Third-place match ===
November 13 or 14, 2027

v

Foote Field, Edmonton, AB

=== Final ===
November 14, 2027

v

Foote Field, Edmonton, AB

== See also ==
- 2027 U Sports Women's Soccer Championship
