= Guelph Athletics =

Athletic department of a university in Canada

- University: University of Guelph
- Nickname: Gryphons
- Association: Canadian Interuniversity Sport
- Conference: Ontario University Athletics
- Location: Guelph, Ontario
- Varsity teams: 11
- Football stadium: Alumni Stadium
- Colours: Gold, black, and red
- Mascot: Griffon
- Website: www.athletics.uoguelph.ca

Guelph Athletics is the athletic department at the University of Guelph, located in Guelph, Ontario. The university athletics program is sponsored by Russell Athletics. Many of the athletic programs are associated with Ontario University Athletics and Canadian Interuniversity Sport, to compete for both provincial and national championships. The university teams are called the Guelph Gryphons.

== History of the Mascot ==
The gryphon is an animal of the earth and the sky and it is composed of a lion's body and an eagle's head and wings where the lion represents strength and the eagle represents intelligence. They are portrayed as half beings of each other to emphasize that strength and intelligence should be used together to be successful. Gryphons, although imaginary, have been depicted through time to be heroic. The background of the gryphon is very majestic and Guelph athletics attempts to embody the gryphon as much as possible.

The Guelph colours are red, gold, and black and are featured on all Guelph athletic apparel from varsity to house league teams as well as on clothing and on memorabilia. The gryphon mascot can be found at all varsity game, inciting cheers and chants from Guelph students and fans.

== Athletic Facilities ==
Athletic facilities at the University of Guelph are separated into four main branches, each housing a variety of facilities for various purposes or sports: W.F. Mitchell Athletics Centre, Gryphon Dome, Gryphon Centre, Alumni Stadium.

=== W.F. Mitchell Athletics Centre ===
The W.F. Mitchell Athletics Centre was originally opened in 1957 containing a triple gym, an ice surface approximately 185 by 65, and a five lane 25 yard pool with a 10-foot (3.0 m) diving board. Since then, a number of renovations and expansions have taken place. Today, the Athletics Centre houses two pools, with the second one, named the Gold Pool, built in 1995. The new pool is used by not only the official University of Guelph swim team, but also public fitness and recreational classes and intramural sports. The original pool that was built in 1957 is now exclusively used for public aquatic classes and intramural sports.

The W.F. Mitchell Athletics Centre also houses the University of Guelph gymnasium and the fitness centre/weight room. The gymnasium is used for basketball as well as other court-based intramural sports. The fitness centre is a 5,500-square-foot (510 m^{2}) facility and is open and supervised 107 hours a week by fitness staff. The Cardio Theatre within the fitness centre contains computerized cardio equipment such as treadmill, elliptical trainer, recumbent and upright bikes, stair climbers, stepmills and rowers along with televisions watch while on the equipment. The Super Circuit section is a mix between strength training and cardio machines and is designed to be a quick 30 minute workout. The strength training rooms are designed for beginners and veterans alike. It houses equipment such as Universal, Icarian, Atlantis, Hammer Strength, Smith Machines, Squat Racks, Core Pole and freeweights.

=== The Gryphon Field House ===
The Gryphon Field House, containing an indoor 200m track covered in astro-turf (synthetic grass), was damaged and considered at risk for participants in 2010. It was dismantled in 2011. The area was converted into the Gryphon Fieldhouse, complete with 200m indoor running surface and turf playing field.

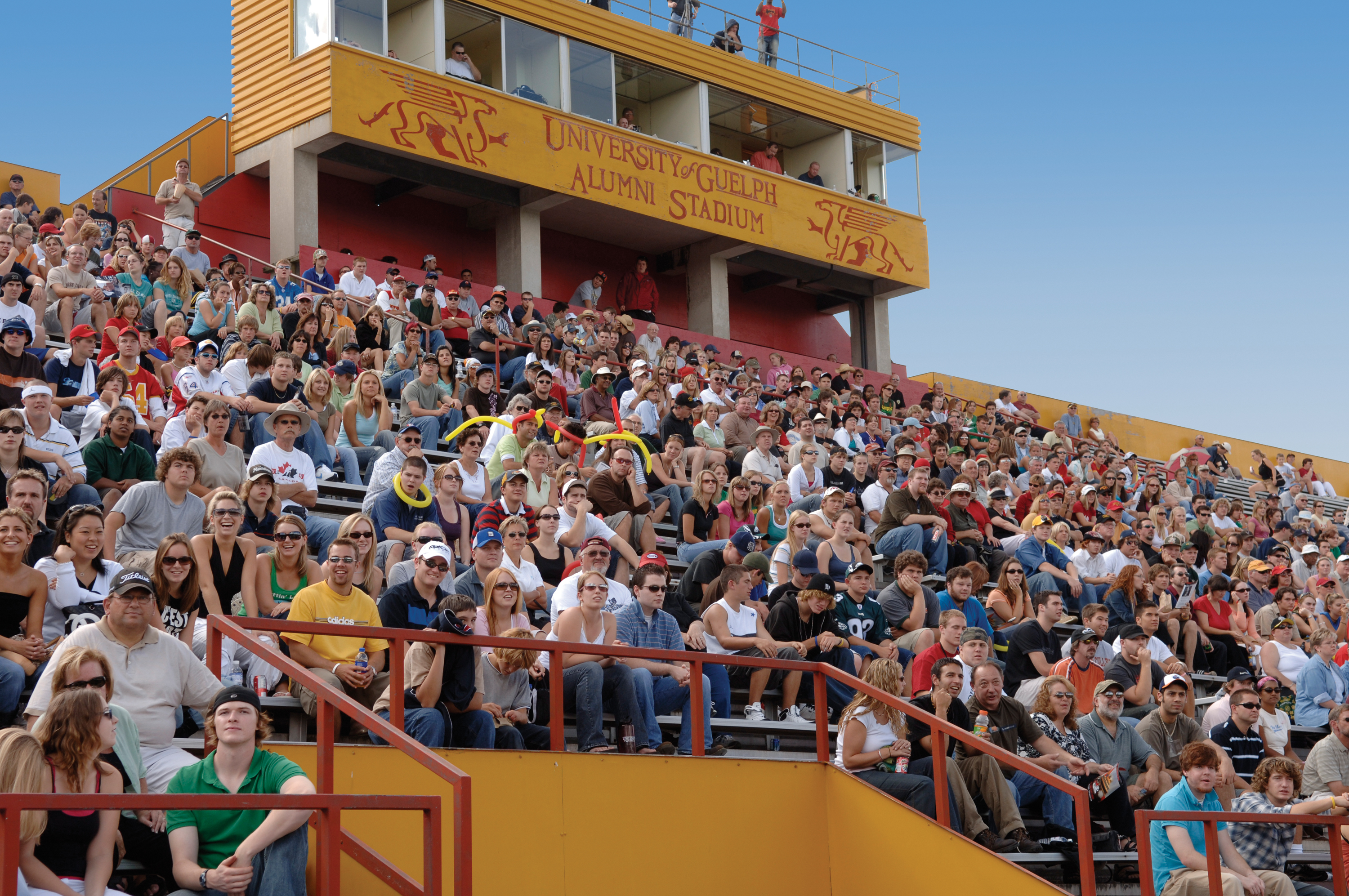
University of Guelph 2009 Homecoming at Alumni Stadium

=== The Gryphon Centre ===
Interior of the "Gold Rink"

The Gryphon Centre contains two ice rinks named "Gold Rink" and "Red Rink". It opened in 1989 and is used by the varsity hockey teams and various intramural programs. The Gold Rink is an Olympic-sized skating rink that seats 1400 spectators, while the Red Rink is used for recreational skating and intramurals.

=== Alumni Stadium ===
Alumni Stadium was built in 1970 and seats 4,100 spectators. It is used almost exclusively for varsity football games. Besides sports, it is also used for the pep rally during orientation week at the beginning of each school year.

=== Gryphon Soccer Complex ===
The Soccer Complex boasts 3 turf fields (2 regulation, 1 training), and 1 grass field. This is home to the Varsity Soccer, Lacrosse, Field Hockey, and Women's Rugby programs.

== Sport clubs and intramurals ==
Aside from varsity sports, the department of athletics also offers various co-ed intramural leagues. These leagues are regulated by students who work for the athletic facilities and run during the open hours of operation for each facility throughout the semesters. The majority of sports which are offered have different skill level variations to cater to those who are highly skilled, and to those who wish to play for recreational purposes. Each sport is open for individual signups or group signups, which each range from various sign up fees. Many, if not all sports cater to both men's, women's and co-ed leagues.

All sport clubs have their own hours of operation throughout the week of particular semesters. Each club has a club fee based on one semester or for the full year. All Guelph athletic clubs have different fees, and be paid for by semester or by year. The prices vary from $5 a semester to $150 a year. Many clubs offered by the University of Guelph, corresponding fees, and club president on the university's website. For students that have an interest of starting their own clubs Guelph Athletics has stated: "The level and intensity will be determined by the demonstrated interest. For more information, please refer to page 40 of the Gryph Guide and contact the Club Contact directly or attend the first meeting for details." Some of the sport clubs at the University of Guelph include:

Ultimate Frisbee has three main leagues, Men, Women and Co-Ed each league has one game a week. The sport is usually played during the months of September and October. Co-ed tournaments are also run throughout the year for interested individuals who want to continue playing after the competitive fall season.

The badminton club provides an opportunity for members of all skill levels to enjoy the sport of badminton. They host monthly in-club mini tournaments as well as regular drop-in play. Birdies and nets are provided.

== Men's sports ==
=== Men's basketball ===
Established in early 1979, the team competes in the OUA West division against the university's longtime rival, the University of Western Ontario. The team runs between September and February of the following year. Generally the team is hand-picked by scouts from various high schools trying to fill a 16-man roster. However, tryouts may be held at the beginning of the school year for the last spot on the team. Pre-season practices, workouts, and tryouts often happen prior to the start of the season, which is held in late October. During the off-season, the team competes in various exhibition games and tournaments against college teams in Ontario, and sometimes teams from the National Collegiate Athletic Association.

=== Men's football ===
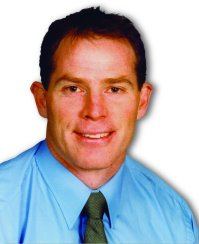
Dan Wicklum, born February 28, 1965, is a former Canadian Football League player. Played for University of Guelph, and helped win the Vanier Cup in 1984 and named an OUAA All-Star in 1987

Football is considered to be the biggest sport at the university and is by far one of the most competitive in the OUA. The football team has a nine-week schedule which starts in early September to the last week of October, Followed by the OUA playoffs which run within the first two weeks of November. Unlike other sports, the OUA only has 10 schools which compete in the OUA football so there is only one division. Since there is only one league, each team competes for Yates Cup, while the champion of the Yates Cup do get the honors to compete for the CIS Vanier Cup, Both of which will earn each school a championship in the respected divisions and will earn each school a banner for their stadiums. In the 2010-2011, the OUA will only have nine teams playing due to the suspension of the Waterloo Warriors and the case of substance abuse. This has shortened the schedule for nine regular games during the season. The team usually has 60 to 80 varsity athletes however, not all will have the opportunity to play for the team. The recruitment process is very similar to other major sports at the University of Guelph. Players are generally hand-picked by coaches and scouts while they play for their respective high school teams. However, for players that try to receive a walk-on role to the team, they must fill out applications and submit highlight reels which then will be reviewed by the coaching staff.

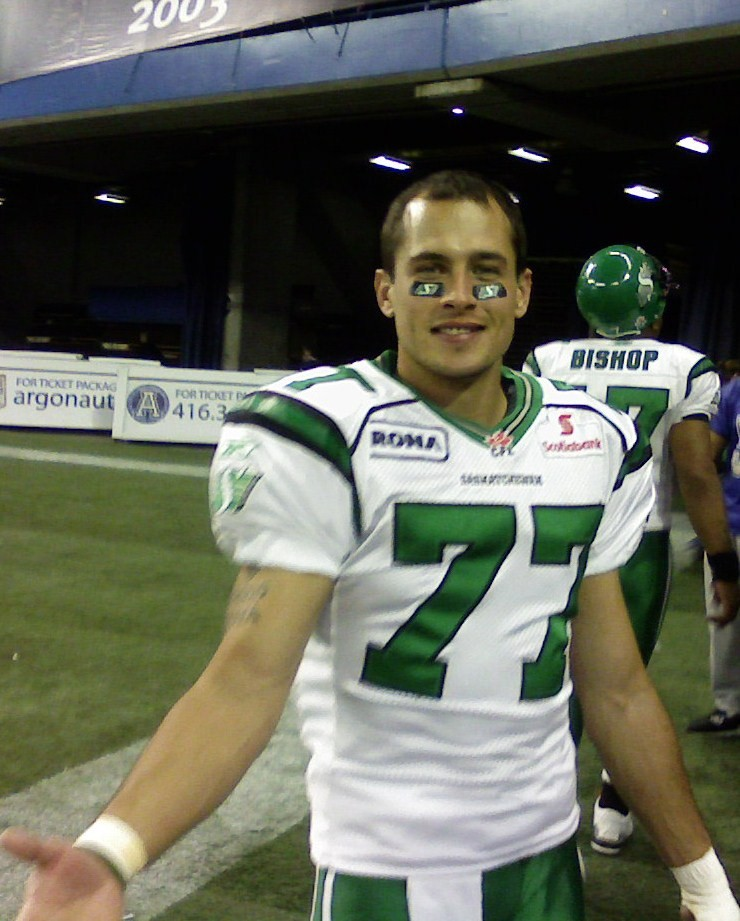
Michael Palmer, born October 31, 1980, played wide receiver for the University of Guelph. He later moved on to become a player of the Toronto Argonauts and the Saskatchewan Roughriders.

=== Men's baseball ===
Established in 1998, the baseball team is not one of the school's most highlighted sports. Although the team does produce a varsity team, it does not receive the same recognition as the football, or even basketball teams. Much like football, the team has an early season starting from the first week of September for a month straight until October. Since it is a short schedule of 18 games and only one month for play, the league often schedules two games per day. Baseball in Ontario is quite small and currently only seven universities compete, with only four games to determine the playoffs and championship. However, unlike many varsity sports the baseball team does not compete in the CIS. The team does however, try to compete for the CIBA (Canadian Intercollegiate Baseball Association).

=== Men's volleyball ===
The men's volleyball team at the University of Guelph had its first year of in the OUA in 1979. The 2010 team consists of 18 men from all around Canada, one coach, four assistants, one trainer, and one sports informer. The team's season consists of 20 games and runs from October 22, 2010, to February 13, 2011, then playoffs last until the end of February. The OUA currently contains 11 competing teams from universities all over Ontario. Some highlights throughout the years has been in 2003–2004. In the 10-team OUA, the Gryphons finished with a 13–5 record for 2nd place and were ranked as high as 8th in the CIS. This marked their best finish since 1982–83 when Guelph finished second in the OUA West Division. The Gryphs won their semi-final series against Western in two straight matches but later lost to the Toronto Blues.

thumb

=== Men's soccer ===
The men's soccer team started in 1979. The current team consists of a total of 23 players, one coach, four assistants, two trainers, one manager, and one sports informer. The season has 14 games from September 4 to October 24, with the post-season lasting until November 7. The OUA has a 17 participating schools around Ontario. In 1990, the Gryphons won their first ever OUAA title defeating the University of Toronto 1–0 in the championship game at Alumni Stadium. After defeating Mount Allison in the CIAU Semis, the Gryphons met the defending champion, UBC Thunderbirds, in the CIAU final but dropped a 2–1 decision before a record crowd at home.

Men's Martial Arts

Martial arts has a large following in Southern Ontario, Guelph is home to one of the most accomplished martial artists. Nathan Skoufis began martial arts at age 6 and has been training ever since. Skoufis is a third degree black belt and an 8X World Champion. Skoufis is sponsored by Hayabusa the leading martial arts equipment and apparel company, a company who also sponsors George St. Pierre and Nieky Holzken. Skoufis attends the University of Guelph, as well as owning and operation his own business Guelph Family Martial Arts located on Woodlawn Road in Guelph. Skoufis at age 12 began to enter the men's division to look for a challenge in karate, routinely fighting 30-year-old men. Skoufis has won world titles in sanctioning leagues NASKA, NBL, NAFMA and IFMA.

== Women's Sports ==
=== Women's Volleyball ===
The women's volleyball team was established in 1979 at the University of Guelph. They compete against other university teams, including McMaster University, TMU, or any other team included in the Ontario University Athletics (OUA) West Division. The team's season runs from September–February, including approximately eight tournaments and twenty matches. The 2009-2010 team, ended their season with twelve losses and fifteen wins.

=== Women's Rugby ===
The women's rugby team formed in 1994. The team competes in the Ontario University Athletics (OUA) Shiels division against university teams from the University of Waterloo, Western, Brock and Laurier. The team's season spans from September–November. The team plays twelve games each season, but only five are recorded in the OUA standings. The Gryphons women's rugby team finished the 2015-2016 year with a perfect 5-0 record.

=== Women's Basketball ===
The team was established in 1979. The woman's basketball team competes in the Ontario University Athletics (OUA) west division. The team's season runs from September – February, playing over thirty games within this period. Fourteen out of thirty matches are recorded by the OUA. The Guelph team had one victory out of fourteen games for the 2009 year.

=== Women's Field Hockey ===
The women's field hockey team was established in 1979. There are nine teams that compete in this particular sport and only one division exists. The team plays from September – November. Twenty-five games are played within this time, and only fourteen of these games are officially recorded by the OUA. In the 2008–2009 year the Gryphons won twelve and tied two games, making the team in first place in the season.

=== Women's Lacrosse ===
In 1997, the University of Guelph put together their first women's lacrosse team. The lacrosse team competes from September – November. Within this time the team plays fifteen games, with only twelve of these recorded by the OUA. The team concluded the 2008-2009 year with a 0–12 record and finished last in the OUA standings.

== The Rankings ==
In terms of sports, Guelph is well known for cross country, Ice hockey and field hockey. According to the performance of 2009-10 season, they have excelled in women's rugby, men's/women's volleyball, women's hockey, and men's/women's track and field. The following is a table which provides standing for the year 2009-10 as per the OUA and CIS records.

Sport	Standing
Men's Baseball	7th place Won 4 Loss 14
Men's Basketball (West Division)	8th place Won 6 Loss 14
Women's Basketball (West Division)	8th place Won 2 Loss 20
Women's Field Hockey	1st place Won 12 Loss 0
Football	6th place Won 3 Loss 5
Men's Hockey	5th place Won 14 Loss 10
Women's Hockey	2nd place Won 2 Loss 1
Men's Lacrosse	6th place Won 0 Loss 11
Men's Rugby	8th place Won 1 Loss 7
Women's Rugby	1st place Won 5 Loss 0
Men's Soccer (West Division)	5th place Won 6 Loss 7
Women's Soccer (West Division)	7th place Won 1 Loss 8
Track & Field	2010 (OUA -Men 2nd place Women 3rd place )- CIS champions-MEN Women 4th place
Men's Volleyball	5th place Won 11 Loss 9
Women's Volleyball	3rd place Won 13 Loss 6

- Sports which are unlisted had incomplete results for compilation purposes.
