= Vancouver Angels =

- Nickname: Angels
- Founded: 2000
- Dissolved: 2001
- Owner: David Stadnyk
- League: Women's Premier Soccer League
- 2000: 4th

Vancouver Angels were a semi-professional women's association football club from Vancouver, British Columbia that competed in the Women's Premier Soccer League. They later merged with the Vancouver Lady 86ers to eventually become the Vancouver Whitecaps Women.

== History ==
=== Origins ===
In 2000, a local Vancouver businessman named David Stadnyk was interested in forming a women's team. He contacted Tammy Crawford (who would end up playing for the team) to help start up the team and Crawford organized the team to play in the Women's Premier Soccer League. Jason Villeneuve served as the team's original coach, followed by Tom McManus. During the 2000 season, the Angels finished in fourth place in the eight team division. The Vancouver Angels wore either red (with white sides beneath the arms) or baby blue Umbro kits with black sleeves with their primary sponsor The Keg Steakhouse & Grill on the front.

=== Merger ===
Following the season, Stadnyk purchased the Vancouver Lady 86ers, the women's team of the Vancouver 86ers, and merged them with the Angels under the name Vancouver Breakers, moving to the USL W-League. This team was eventually renamed to the Vancouver Whitecaps Women in 2003, after the team was purchased by Greg Kerfoot.

== Seasons ==
Women

Season	League	Teams	Record	Rank	Ref
2000	Women's Premier Soccer League	8	5–5–4	4th	

== Notable players ==
- Geri Donnelly
- Randee Hermus
- Andrea Neil
- Christine Sinclair
