= 2027 U Sports Women's Soccer Championship =

Tournament details
- Country: Canada
- Cities: Calgary, Alberta
- Venue: McMahon Stadium
- Dates: November 11–14, 2027
- Teams: 8

The 2027 U Sports Women's Soccer Championship will be the 40th edition of the U Sports women's soccer championship, a postseason tournament to determine the national champion of the 2027 U Sports women's soccer season. The tournament will be played November 11–14, 2027 at McMahon Stadium and hosted by the University of Calgary.

== Host ==
The tournament will be held at McMahon Stadium and will be hosted by the University of Calgary. This will be the first U Sports women's soccer championship event hosted by the Calgary Dinos.

== Qualified teams ==
The championship will consist of an eight-team single-elimination tournament. One team qualified as the hosts, four teams qualify as winners of each of the four conferences, one team from each of CW and OUA qualify as conference medalists, and one team from RSEQ will qualify based on RSEQ's performance at the previous year's championship.

=== Participating teams ===
Team	Conf.	Qualified as (conference result)	Qualified on	Last win
Calgary Dinos	CW	Hosts	September 15, 2026	1998
	AUS	Champions		
	CW	Champions		
	OUA	Champions		
	RSEQ	Champions		
	CW	Runners-up		
	OUA	Runners-up		
	RSEQ	Runners-up		

== Bracket ==
Fifth-place match

Consolation semi-finals

Quarter-finals
1
8
4
5
2
7
3
6

Semi-finals

Final
Third-place match

== Results ==
=== Quarter-finals ===
November 11, 2027

v

McMahon Stadium, Calgary, AB
November 11, 2027

v

McMahon Stadium, Calgary, AB
November 11, 2027

v

McMahon Stadium, Calgary, AB
November 11, 2027

v

McMahon Stadium, Calgary, AB

=== Consolation semi-finals ===
November 12, 2027

v

McMahon Stadium, Calgary, AB
November 12, 2027

v

McMahon Stadium, Calgary, AB

=== Semi-finals ===
November 12, 2027

v

McMahon Stadium, Calgary, AB
November 12, 2027

v

McMahon Stadium, Calgary, AB

=== Fifth-place match ===
November 13, 2027

v

McMahon Stadium, Calgary, AB

=== Third-place match ===
November 13 or 14, 2027

v

McMahon Stadium, Calgary, AB

=== Final ===
November 14, 2027

v

McMahon Stadium, Calgary, AB

== See also ==
- 2027 U Sports Men's Soccer Championship
