= Arts County Fair =

Annual benefit concert/beer garden in Vancouver, Canada

Arts County Fair (ACF) was an annual large outdoor benefit concert/beer garden that ran from 1992 to 2007 at Thunderbird Stadium at the University of British Columbia, Vancouver, Canada.

Arts County Fair was the largest student-run event in Canada; organized, produced, and promoted by the students of the Arts Undergraduate Society of the University of British Columbia.

== Event ==
It combined several bands of different musical genres, one hundred and fifty volunteers, and fifteen thousand patrons to create the most widely anticipated campus event at the University of British Columbia. The fair was not held on a specific date each year, but instead on the last day of classes at UBC. This usually put the fair during the first and sometimes second week of April each year. It has been estimated that over 160,000 people have attended the event.

It usually ran from 12 p.m. to 8 p.m., and was attended by students from across British Columbia, by members of the local music and recording industries, as well as the general public. Arts County Fair was a charity event, and each year the proceeds from the concert were donated to two local or national charities.

== Production ==
In preparation for the fair, the organizing committee used to commit one week to full scale preparation for the event. A group of 40-50 individuals, mostly composed of past and serving members of the Arts Undergraduate Society council, took to the field of Thunderbird Stadium. Preparations included setting up concession tents, placing plywood and covering over the entire field to prevent grass damage, and assisting with the set-up of fences. On the day of the fair, the volunteers then committed to a fifteen-hour work shift, fulfilling such essential jobs as safety patrols and drink distribution.

The preparations for ACF 11 were filmed in an attempt to document the event for training purposes, but the finished video was never delivered. The partial video is available on YouTube

== Food and Beverage ==
ACF was often heralded as the year's biggest beer garden, with alcoholic beverages being the staple at every fair. Because this caused issues with minors attending the event, ACF organizers tested out two options over the years. One is having the event completely closed off to minors, such as ACF 14. And the other to have a special beer garden section and a minors sections, such as at ACF 15. The latter option worked well with both groups of people being able to enjoy the concert. There used to also be a large section of concession stands that serve non-alcoholic beverages and various types of food.

== Bands ==
It was the goal of the ACF organizers to represent as many genres of music at their concerts as possible. This involved frequent inclusions of rock, country and hip-hop acts in the show. Although the Fair did not exclude non-Canadian acts, ACF advertises itself as a showcase of local Canadian talent. The stage has seen many big-name bands, some before they met commercial success: Barenaked Ladies, Crash Test Dummies, The Philosopher Kings, Matthew Good Band, Corb Lund, Great Big Sea, Swollen Members, De La Soul, Treble Charger, K-OS, The Weakerthans, The New Pornographers, Stabilo, Sam Roberts, and Metric.

=== ACF 1 – April 3, 1992 ===
- Barenaked Ladies
- Spirit of the West
- Bob's Your Uncle
- The Grames Brothers

=== ACF 2 – April 2, 1993 ===
- Crash Test Dummies
- Bourbon Tabernacle Choir
- John James
- She Stole My Beer

=== ACF 3 – March 31, 1994 ===
- Spirit of the West
- The Spirit Merchants
- People Playing Music
- The Lowest of the Low
- Junkhouse

=== ACF 4 – March 31, 1995 ===
- Moist
- One
- The Philosopher Kings
- Rhymes With Orange
- Mollie's Revenge

=== ACF 5 – April 4, 1996 ===
- Ashley MacIsaac
- The Pursuit of Happiness
- Bass is Base
- Barstool Prophets
- The Super Friendz

=== ACF 6 – April 11, 1997 ===
- 54-40
- Big Sugar
- One Step Beyond
- Mudgirl
- Pluto

=== ACF 7 – April 7, 1998 ===
- Great Big Sea
- Matthew Good Band
- Rascalz
- Holly McNarland
- Huevos Rancheros

=== ACF 8 – April 9, 1999 ===
Bands

- 54-40
- Econoline Crush
- The Planet Smashers
- The Odds
- Pure

DJs

- Markem
- Eric Lewis
- James Brown
- Andy B
- Seamus

=== ACF 9 – April 5, 2000 ===
Bands

- Moist
- The Watchmen
- Danko Jones
- The Rascalz
- Gob

DJs

- Grooverobber
- DJ Kita Kaze
- DJ Sebastian
- DJ Wax
- DJ Seven vs. Cliff Vermette

=== ACF 10 – April 5, 2001 ===
Bands

- Big Sugar
- Wide Mouth Mason
- Choclair
- Limblifter
- Templar

DJs

- DJ Deko-ze
- Greg C
- DJ Deliverance
- Jay C

=== ACF 11 – April 5, 2002 ===
- The Tea Party
- Big Wreck
- Swollen Members
- Baby Blue Soundcrew (feat. Choclair)
- The New Deal

DJs

- Jon Delerious
- DJ Leanne
- Mack Hardy
- Dirty Circus (feat Sweatshop Union)
- ari + uzi

=== ACF 12 – April 9, 2003 ===
- 54-40
- Treble Charger
- I Mother Earth
- The New Deal (feat Razhel of The Roots)
- Not By Choice

DJs

- Sweatshop Union
- Fourth World Occupants
- Rupix Cube
- Dana D v. Kamandi
- Needle Kineval v. Hedspin
- DJ Wundrkut

=== ACF 13 – April 8, 2004 ===
- De La Soul
- Andrew W.K.
- Wide Mouth Mason
- Pilate
- High Holy Days

DJs

- Abasi vs. Glnn
- Tantra
- REV vs. Kyle Nordman
- OJ
- Crown Vic

=== ACF 14 – April 8, 2005 ===
- Matthew Good
- K-OS
- Metric
- Stabilo
- Tupelo Honey

=== ACF 15 – April 7, 2006 ===
- The New Pornographers
- The Weakerthans
- Corb Lund and the Hurtin Albertans
- Cadence Weapon
- The Salteens
- dj my!gay!husband!

=== ACF 16 – April 12, 2007 ===
- Sam Roberts
- Aaron Pritchett
- De La Soul
- Pride Tiger
- Land of Talk
- DJ my!gay!husband!

== External sources ==
- "Arts County Fair Official Website".
