= Vancouver Cougars =

Vancouver Australian Football Club
- Full name: Vancouver Cougars
- Nickname: The Cougars
- Sport: Australian rules football
- Founded: 2001
- League: British Columbia Australian Football League
- Home ground: Thunderbird Stadium (3,200) / Burnaby Lake Rugby Club
- Anthem: "The Red and the Blue"
- President: Jason Hughes
- Captain: Thomas Urquhart
- Website: Vancouver Cougars

Strip
- Vertical Blue and Red striped Guernsey with Cougar logo, Red Shorts and Striped Blue and Red socks

The Vancouver Cougars are a member of the Australian Football League Canada and compete in the British Columbia Australian Football League (BCAFL).

The club was founded in Vancouver, British Columbia, Canada on January 15, 2001, becoming the first ever Aussie Rules club in the City of Vancouver.

== History ==
Club founders James Lay and Stuart Grills had played Australian Football for the Seattle Cats throughout 2000. Large numbers of Australians visiting the city annually, as well as numbers of non-Australians that had shown an interest in the sport, prompted investigations into founding a club in Vancouver.

Grills had talked to Duncan McFarlane (an ex-pat Australian) about starting a team in Vancouver and was given a great deal of encouragement and many contacts in Australia who may be able to help. In December 2000, Lay and Grills agreed that it would take considerable organisation to get a Vancouver Team started. Stuart had been advertising Australian Football by placing posters on his car, but there had been no real response. In December, Stuart received several emails from Greg Everett (Junior Development Executive-CAFA), and it was agreed that the Vancouver team would need resources such as footballs, uniforms (jumpers) and coaching materials to get the team started. Thanks to the efforts of Greg Everett and the behind the scenes promotions by CAFA via their website, the team began to gain numbers.

Within the first few weeks of January 2001, Stuart had been contacted by several individuals interested in playing footy. The very first training session witnessed four players in attendance: James Lay, Stuart Grills, Peter Campion and Greg Everett. The seeds had been planted and the team was growing.

The first official team game was held on March 17, 2001. The VAFC played an exhibition game of Gaelic Football against the Vancouver Irish Sporting Social Club – men and women. It was a huge success and, even though the Irish won convincingly, it developed a great relationship with their organisation and is now scheduled as the first event of every season, becoming a Cougars tradition.

The Official 2001 Team List comprised 33 players (36% Non-Aust).

The club slowly helped the development of a second Vancouver area team, the Burnaby Eagles. In 2007 the Burnaby Eagles became their own entity and call Burnaby Lakes Rugby Club their home.

The numbers attracted to the fast-paced sport helped the Vancouver Cougars split yet again in 2008. This was the birth of the West Coast Saints, coached by former Vancouver Cougars premiership coach Scott Sheen.

In 2017 the Vancouver Cougars won the BCAFL Grand Final against the West Coast Saints.

== Jumpers and colours ==
It was agreed by the founding members that the club needed to have a visual identity that was reflective of a power but most importantly made reference to the Canadian territory where the club would be based, deciding on the "Cougars". The VAFC is represented in all media relations and club materials as the "Cougars" and is supported by the image of the Cougar on its official logo.

The Cougars have a sister-club relationship with Port Melbourne in the VFL, and wear similar jumpers (red and blue vertical stripes), the only addition being the Cougars' logo on the front. The complete set of jumpers were donated by Port Melbourne as well as a number of Australian footballs.

== Premierships and club records ==
NWPAFL Premierships:

- 2001
- 2002
- 2004
- 2006
- 2007
- 2012

USAFL National Championships Premierships:

- 2008 – Division One

British Columbia Australian Football League (BCAFL) Premierships

- 2015
- 2017

== Juniors ==
There is an affiliated eight-team juniors league, the North Delta Junior Australian Football League, also in Vancouver.
