= 2025 U Sports Women's Soccer Championship =

Tournament details
- Country: Canada
- Cities: Hamilton, Ontario
- Venue: Ron Joyce Stadium
- Dates: November 6–9, 2025
- Teams: 8

Final positions
- Champions: Montreal Carabins
- Runners-up: UBC Thunderbirds
- Third place: Laval Rouge et Or; Trinity Western Spartans (Note: Third-place match cancelled due to snow. Both teams awarded co-bronze medalists.)

Tournament statistics
- Matches played: 10
- Goals scored: 29 (2.9 per match)

Awards
- Championship MVP: Karine Vilain (Montreal)

The 2025 U Sports Women's Soccer Championship was the 38th edition of the U Sports women's soccer championship, a postseason tournament to determine the national champion of the 2025 U Sports women's soccer season. The tournament was played November 6–9, 2025 at Ron Joyce Stadium on the campus of McMaster University.

== Host ==
The tournament was held at Ron Joyce Stadium, on the grounds of the McMaster University. This was the 2nd U Sports women's soccer championship event hosted at McMaster, having previously hosted in 1992.

== Qualified teams ==
The championship consisted of an eight-team single-elimination tournament. One team qualified as the hosts, four teams qualified as winners of each of the four conferences, one team from each of CW and OUA qualified as conference medalists, and one team from RSEQ qualified based on RSEQ's performance at the previous year's championship.

=== Participating teams ===
Team	Conf.	Qualified as	Qualified on	Last win
McMaster Marauders	OUA	Hosts	February 27, 2025	1991
Cape Breton Capers	AUS	Conference champions	October 26, 2025	2007
UBC Thunderbirds	CW	Conference champions	October 30, 2025	2024
Toronto Varsity Blues	OUA	Conference champions	October 25, 2025	None
Montreal Carabins	RSEQ	Conference champions	October 24, 2025	2022
Trinity Western Spartans	CW	Conference runners-up	October 30, 2025	2013
Guelph Gryphons	OUA	Conference runners-up	October 25, 2025	None
Laval Rouge et Or	RSEQ	Conference runners-up	October 24, 2025	2016

== Bracket ==
Fifth-place match
Cape Breton Capers	0
Toronto Varsity Blues	2

Consolation semi-finals
Guelph Gryphons	0
Cape Breton Capers	1
McMaster Marauders	0
Toronto Varsity Blues	2

Quarter-finals
1	UBC Thunderbirds	2
8	Guelph Gryphons	1
4	Cape Breton Capers	1
5	Laval Rouge et Or	2
2	Montreal Carabins	2
7	McMaster Marauders	0
3	Toronto Varsity Blues	1
6	Trinity Western Spartans	3

Semi-finals
UBC Thunderbirds	3
Laval Rouge et Or	2
Montreal Carabins	4
Trinity Western Spartans	0

Final
UBC Thunderbirds	1
Montreal Carabins	2
Third-place match
Laval Rouge et Or	–
Trinity Western Spartans	–

== Results ==
=== Quarter-finals ===
November 6, 2025
11:00 am

Cape Breton Capers	1–2	Laval Rouge et Or
	Report

Ron Joyce Stadium, Hamilton, Ontario
Attendance: 2,100
November 6, 2025
1:30 pm

UBC Thunderbirds	2–1	Guelph Gryphons
	Report

Ron Joyce Stadium, Hamilton, Ontario
November 6, 2025
5:00 pm

Toronto Varsity Blues	1–3	Trinity Western Spartans
	Report

Ron Joyce Stadium, Hamilton, Ontario
November 6, 2025
7:30 pm

Montreal Carabins	2–0	McMaster Marauders
	Report

Ron Joyce Stadium, Hamilton, Ontario

=== Consolation semi-finals ===
November 7, 2025
11:00 am

Cape Breton Capers	1–0	Guelph Gryphons
	Report

Ron Joyce Stadium, Hamilton, Ontario
November 7, 2025
1:30 pm

McMaster Marauders	0–2	Toronto Varsity Blues
	Report

Ron Joyce Stadium, Hamilton, Ontario

=== Semi-finals ===
November 7, 2025
5:00 pm

Laval Rouge et Or	2–3	UBC Thunderbirds
	Report

Ron Joyce Stadium, Hamilton, Ontario
November 7, 2025
7:30 pm

Trinity Western Spartans	0–4	Montreal Carabins
	Report

Ron Joyce Stadium, Hamilton, Ontario

=== Fifth-place match ===
November 8, 2025
5:00 pm

Cape Breton Capers	0–2	Toronto Varsity Blues
	Report

Ron Joyce Stadium, Hamilton, Ontario

=== Third-place match ===
November 9, 2025
1:30 pm

Laval Rouge et Or	Cancelled	Trinity Western Spartans

Ron Joyce Stadium, Hamilton, Ontario

=== Final ===
November 9, 2025
7:30 pm

UBC Thunderbirds	1–2	Montreal Carabins
	Report

Ron Joyce Stadium, Hamilton, Ontario

== See also ==
- 2025 U Sports Men's Soccer Championship
