= Tammy Crawford =

Canadian soccer player

Personal information
- Full name: Tammy Gage
- Birth name: Tammy Crawford
- Date of birth: October 17, 1974 (age 52)
- Place of birth: Surrey, British Columbia
- Position: Midfielder

Youth career
- Sur-Del Girls Soccer Club

College career
Years	Team	Apps	(Gls)
1992	Langara Falcons		
1993–1996	UBC Thunderbirds		

Senior career*
Years	Team	Apps	(Gls)
2000	Vancouver Angels		
2001–2003	Vancouver Breakers/Whitecaps		
- * Club domestic league appearances and goals

Tammy Gage (née Crawford; born October 17, 1974) is a Canadian former women's soccer player and the former Director of Operations of the USL W-League.

== Early life ==
Crawford began playing soccer in Surrey, British Columbia at the age of four. During her youth career, she was coached by her father, Brian Crawford, going on to win five provincial championships and two national titles for her club team and also played for the BC provincial team for five years where she won four gold medals and a silver medal at the National Championships.

== College career ==
After high school, she attended Langara College where she played on the soccer team and earned Athlete of the Year, All-Canadian, a Provincial Title, set the school's goal scoring record. After a year, she moved to the University of British Columbia playing for the Thunderbirds women's team, earning Gold, Silver and Bronze in consecutive years at the National Championships as well as being named an All-Canadian four times, Canada-West All-Star and the 1993 CIAU National Championship MVP. She was named to the University of British Columbia Hall of Fame in 2014.

== Playing career ==
While at UBC, she won the Jubilee Trophy, the Canadian amateur championship, twice in 1994 and 1996 with Coquitlam SC Metro Ford Strikers and UBC Alumni respectively.

In 2000, while working as a substitute teacher, David Stadnyk, a local Vancouver businessman, was interested in starting a women’s soccer team and he contacted Crawford to help put together a women's team. Together they formed the Vancouver Angels playing in the US-based Women's Premier Soccer League, with Crawford also playing on the team.

A year later, the Angels merged with the Vancouver Lady 86ers to become the Vancouver Breakers playing in the USL W-League, with Crawford remaining on the team (they again were renamed to the Whitecaps the following year). While with Vancouver, she served as Director of Operations for the Whitecaps Women and worked corporate sales for the Vancouver Whitecaps men's team.

She remained with the Whitecaps through the 2003 season, after which she became the League Director of the USL W-League.

== International career ==
She played with the Canada women's national soccer team in 1993 and 1994.

== Personal ==
In 2006, she married Derek Gage. She currently owns and serves as director of NexStar Soccer in Florida.
