= Burnaby Eagles =

Burnaby Australian Rules Football Club

Names
- Nickname: The Eagles

Club details
- Founded: 2005
- Colours: Yellow Blue
- Competition: British Columbia Australian Rules Football League
- Premierships: 2011 - BC AFL Premiership
- Ground: Burnaby Lakes Sports Complex

Other information
- Official website: burnabyeagles.com

The Burnaby Eagles is an Australian Rules Football team playing in the British Columbia Australian Football League, plus various tournaments held in Western Canada and North-West United States. The club fields both a Men's and a Women's team.

The club was established in 2005 and is based in Burnaby, British Columbia with home matches at the Burnaby Lakes Sports Complex.

== 2005 to 2008 - Formative years ==
The Burnaby Eagles was formed in 2005 as the second club based in Vancouver, alongside the Vancouver Cougars. During these years the club played in a wider North-Western competition against teams from Alberta, Washington State and Oregon.

== 2009 to 2012 - Premiership Years ==
By 2010 several new clubs were formed in Vancouver starting the BC AFL Premiership competition as a 4 team competition. In 2009 the Eagles were beaten grand finalist under the guidance of Matthew Bell as coach.

In 2011 Adam Kelly was appointed coach and enjoyed a dominant first season with the Eagles only losing one game throughout the season. The Eagles won a closely contested grand final in wet and cold conditions against West Coast Saints to record their first premiership, final scores 7.7.49 to 6.5.41 a win by 8 points. High-flying centre half forward Adam Simpson capped the season by winning both the BC AFL best & fairest and the leading goal-kicker in the competition.

In 2012 the Eagles witness a high turnover of players but still managed to claw their way into the grand final after an exciting 6 point semi-final win against West Coast Saints. The grand final was a torrid affair on a hot day with Vancouver Cougars eventually prevailing in the last quarter.

== 2013 to 2019 - Canadian Development ==
The club started to focus on the development of Canadian players, with the club noted for the numerous Canadian representatives during this time. Canadian players were the club B&F winners for four years running, Jim Oertel (2015 & 2016), Gino Brancati (2017) and Trent Loosemore (2018) all becoming regular Canadian representatives.

On the field the club struggled for several seasons although David Kuss won the league goal-kicking in 2013. The Burnaby Eagles next appeared in a grand final during the 2016 season with Jake Wilkins the coach however went down in a close game by 10 points.

In 2019 Rory Bennett became the first Eagle in 8 years to win the BC AFL best & fairest.

== 2020 to present - Women's team and post-COVID ==
Women players had occasionally played in the Men's BC AFL competition. In 2018 a fully fledged Women's club Vancouver Vixens was formed as the only Women's team in Vancouver. The team would play against nearby Seattle and various tournaments. In late 2019 the Vixens team merged with Burnaby Eagles to form the only Vancouver based club with both a Women's and Men's section.

COVID interrupted both the 2020 and 2021 seasons with a tentative restart in 2022.

== Honours ==
- 2005 Season – NW Pacific Grand Finalists (vs Seattle)
- 2006 Season – NW Pacific Grand Finalists (vs Vancouver Cougars)
- 2006 Season – US Regional Championships Winners (combined with Vancouver Cougars)
- 2009 Season – BCAFL Grand Finalists (vs West Coast Saints)
- 2011 Season – BCAFL Premiership Winners (vs West Coast Saints)
- 2012 Season – BCAFL Grand Finalists (vs Vancouver Cougars)
- 2016 Season - BCAFL Grand Finalists (vs West Coast Saints)
- 2023 Season - Kelowna Cup Winners (Men's & Women's), AFL Canada Cup Winners (Women)

== Guernseys ==
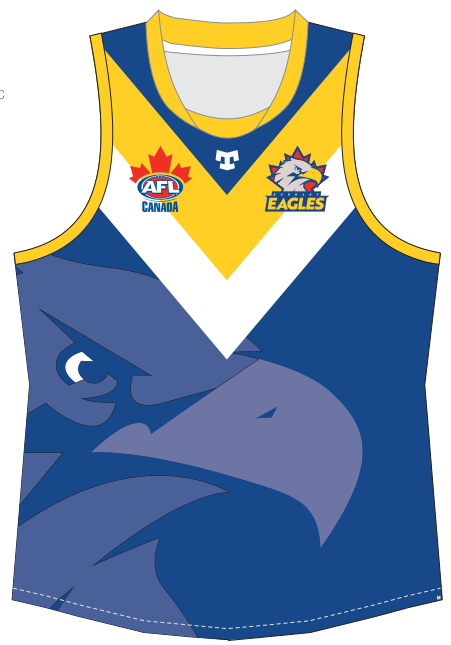
Burnaby Eagles Guernsey 2020

The club guernsey was originally based on the West Coast Eagles strip, blue with yellow sides and wore the guernseys during the premiership season. In 2013 the guernsey followed the lead of the West Coast Eagles by switching to a vertical stripe of Blue, white and yellow.

The club wore a unique design between 2016 and 2019 consisting of left-hand side bright yellow and the right-hand side of the guernsey a lighter blue than previous variations.

The current guernsey iteration was designed in early 2020 and is worn by both the Men's and Women's teams. The guernsey contains a classic v-shape of yellow and white with lighter blue covering the rest of the guernsey.
