= Guelph Gryphons =

Athletic teams of the University of Guelph, Canada

- University: University of Guelph
- Nickname: Gryphs
- Association: U Sports
- Conference: Ontario University Athletics
- Athletic director: Scott McRoberts
- Location: Guelph, Ontario
- Varsity teams: 39 (20 men's, 19 women's)
- Football stadium: Alumni Stadium
- Arena: Gryphon Centre
- Baseball stadium: David E. Hastings Stadium
- Soccer field: Gryphon Soccer Complex
- Natatorium: Gryphon Aquatic Centre
- Indoor track and field venue: Gryphon Fieldhouse
- Colours: Red, black, and gold
- Mascot: Gryph
- Website: gryphons.ca
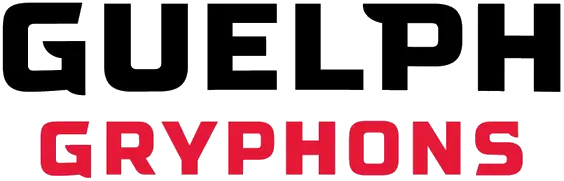

The Guelph Gryphons are the athletic teams that represent the University of Guelph in Guelph, Ontario, Canada. The university's varsity teams compete in the Ontario University Athletics conference of the U Sports (OUA's), and, where applicable, in the west division. The university teams are often referred to as the Gryphs, which is short for the school's mascot, Gryph, the gryphon.

== Varsity teams ==
Guelph Gryphons teams compete in:

Men's sports	Women's sports
Badminton	Badminton
Baseball	
Basketball	Basketball
Cross country	Cross country
Curling	Curling
Fencing	Fencing
	Field hockey
Figure skating	Figure skating
Football	
Golf	Golf
Ice hockey	Ice hockey
Lacrosse	Lacrosse
Nordic skiing	Nordic skiing
Rowing	Rowing
Rugby	Rugby
Soccer	Soccer
Swimming	Swimming
Squash	Squash
Track and field	Track and field
Volleyball	Volleyball
Wrestling	Wrestling

=== Baseball ===
Established in 1998, the baseball team is not one of the school's most well known programs. Although the team does produce a varsity team, it does not receive the same recognition as the football, or even basketball teams. Much like football, the team has an early season starting from the first week of September for a month straight until October. Since it is a short schedule of 21 games and only one month for play, the league often schedules two games per day. University baseball in the OUA is growing and currently eight universities compete, four of which qualify for the playoffs and championship. However, unlike many varsity sports the baseball team does not compete in the CIS. The team does, however, try to compete in the CIBA (Canadian Intercollegiate Baseball Association). In 2012, the Gryphons baseball team established a new team wins record by obtaining 14 wins in regular season play. The Gryphons finished second in the OUA standings and it meant that the team would advance to the OUA playoffs for the first time since 2004. In the playoffs, the Gryphons started strong by defeating Western before dropping the next to Toronto in a nail biter for a chance at a place in the final. The team would lose the semi-final to Brock to close out the season in third place.

=== Men's basketball ===
Garney Henley took over as head coach for the Basketball team in the 1965–66 season taking it from an intramural program to a varsity contender. In the 1973–74 season, the team entered the CIAU National Basketball championship as a wild card team. The team won the National Basketball Game for the first time in the school's history beating St. Mary's University with the final score of 74–72.

The team competes in the OUA West division along with the university's longtime rival, the University of Western Ontario. The team plays its games from October to February of the following year. Generally, the team is hand-picked by scouts from various high schools trying to fill a 16-man roster. However, tryouts may be held at the beginning of the school year for the last spot on the team. Pre-season practices, workouts, and tryouts often happen prior to the start of the season, which is held in late October. During the off-season, the team competes in various exhibition games and tournaments against college teams in Ontario, and sometimes teams from the National Collegiate Athletic Association.

=== Women's basketball ===
The women's basketball team was established in 1971 (or earlier) and competes in the Ontario University Athletics (OUA) west division. The team's season runs from November to February, playing over thirty games within this period.

=== Field hockey ===
The women's field hockey team was established in 1979. There are nine teams that compete in this sport and only one division exists. The team plays from September to November. 25 games are played within this time, and only fourteen of these games are officially recorded by the OUA.

=== Football ===
The Guelph Gryphons football team has been in competition since 1950 and is considered to be the biggest sport at the university. The football team has a nine-week schedule which starts in late August to the last week of October, followed by the OUA playoffs which run within the first three weeks of November. Unlike other sports, there are only 11 schools that compete in OUA football, so there is only one division. The team usually has 60 to 80 varsity athletes however, not all will have the opportunity to play for the team. The recruitment process is very similar to other major sports at the University of Guelph. Players are generally hand-picked by coaches and scouts while they play for their respective high school teams.

=== Men's ice hockey ===
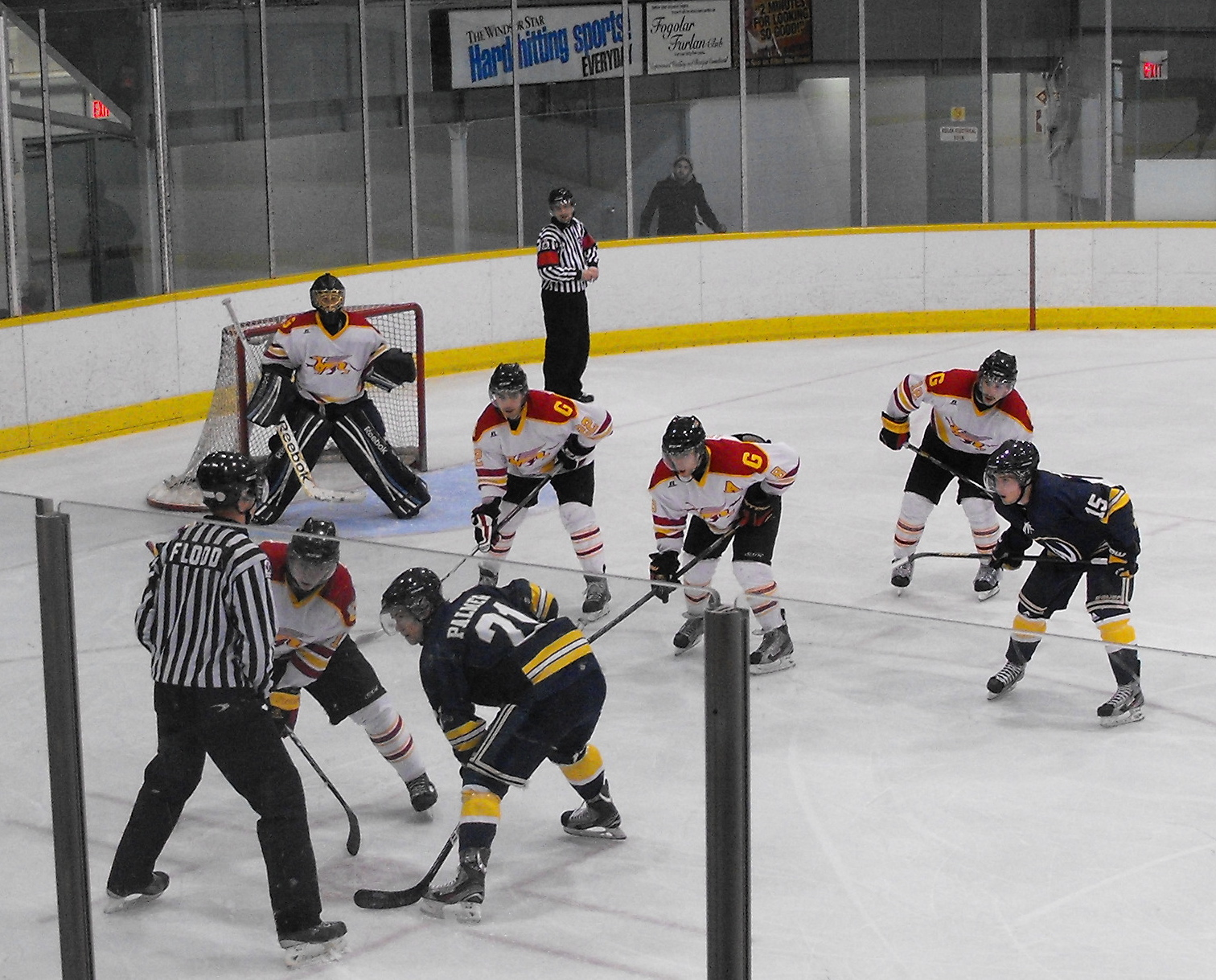
Men's Gryphons action during 2012-13 hockey season.

The men's ice hockey team dates back to the early days of collegiate hockey in North America. The team was originally known as the Ontario Agricultural College hockey team. As the OAC, the team competed as early as the 1899–00 Ontario Hockey Association Intermediate season and transitioned to the University of Guelph Gryphons while sitting out the 1963–64 season. The Gryphons won the University Cup in 1997, emblematic of Canadian scholastic hockey supremacy. The Gryphons have also won league titles in 1976, 1979, 1980, 1994, 1997 and 2015.

=== Women's ice hockey ===
The women's ice hockey team was established in 1979. There are currently 11 teams that compete in the OUA and thus only one division exists. The team plays from September to February. 26 OUA games are played within this time, with several exhibition games played before and sometimes during the regular season. In the 2016–17 season, the Gryphons repeated as OUA champions, with a convincing 6–1 win on home ice over the Nipissing Lakers, to lift the McCaw Cup.

=== Men's lacrosse ===
The University of Guelph's men's lacrosse team participates in the Canadian University Field Lacrosse Association (CUFLA). They have won the championship, known as the "Baggataway Cup", five times - in 1995, 2000, 2008, 2013 and 2014.

The Baggataway Cup is not affiliated with the OUA.

=== Women's lacrosse ===
In 1997, the University of Guelph put together their first women's lacrosse team. The lacrosse team competes from September to November. Within this time the team plays fifteen games, with only twelve of these recorded by the OUA.

=== Women's rugby ===
The women's rugby team formed in 1994. The team competes in the Ontario University Athletics (OUA) Shiels division. The team's season spans from September to November. The team plays twelve games each season, but only five are recorded in the OUA standings. The Gryphons women's rugby team finished the 2008-2009 year with a perfect 5–0 record. The Guelph Gryphons have been working towards a National Gold medal for the past four years earning Bronze at the CIS championships between 2007 and 2010. Finally finishing their 2011–2012 season with Gold, they returned from the national University 7's tournament in BC receiving their second Gold for the 2011–2012 season.

=== Men's soccer ===
The men's soccer team started in 1979. The current team consists of a total of 23 players, one coach, four assistants, two trainers, one manager, and one sports informer. The season has 14 games from September to October, with the post-season lasting through November. The OUA has 17 participating schools around Ontario. In 1990, the Gryphons won their first OUA title defeating the Toronto Varsity Blues 1–0 in the championship game at Alumni Stadium. After defeating Mount Allison in the CIAU Semis, the Gryphons met the defending champion, UBC Thunderbirds, in the CIAU final but dropped a 2–1 decision before a record crowd at home.

In the 2016–17 season, the Guelph Gryphons Men's Soccer team were crowned OUA champions in a 3–1 win over the rival York Lions. This represents their first OUA title since 1990.

=== Men's volleyball ===
The men's volleyball team at the University of Guelph had its first year of in the OUA in 1979. The 2010 team consists of 18 men from all around Canada, one coach, four assistants, one trainer, and one sports informer. The team's season consists of 20 games and runs from October to February while playoffs last until the end of February. The OUA currently contains 11 competing teams from universities all over Ontario. Some highlights throughout the years has been in 2003–04 where the Gryphons finished with a 13–5 record for 2nd place and were ranked as high as 8th in the CIS. This marked their best finish since 1982–83 when Guelph finished second in the OUA West Division. The Gryphs won their semi-final series against Western in two straight matches but later lost to the Toronto Varsity Blues. In the 2016–17 season, the Guelph Gryphons achieved a bronze medal.

=== Women's volleyball ===
The women's volleyball team was established in 1979 at the University of Guelph. They compete in the Ontario University Athletics (OUA) West Division. The team's season runs from September to February, including approximately eight tournaments and twenty matches. They have yet to win an OUA championship.

== Awards and honours ==
- 2019 OUA Male Athlete of the Year: Jace Kotsopoulos, Soccer
- 2019 OUA Female Coach of the Year: Rachel Flanagan, Ice Hockey
- 2019 OUA Female Team of the Year: Guelph Gryphons women's ice hockey

=== Athletes of the Year ===
Year	Athlete (female)	Sport	Athlete (male)	Sport	Ref.
2014–15	Carise Thompson	Cross Country	Ross Proudfoot	Cross Country	
2015–16	Valérie Lamenta	Ice hockey	John Rush	Football	
2016–17	Ashley Connell	Track and Field	Tommy Land	Track and Field	
2017–18	Sarah Hammond	Track and Field	Tommy Land	Track and Field	
2018–19	Jenna Westaway	Track and Field	Jace Kotsopoulos	Soccer	
2019–20	Zoe Sherar	Track and Field	Job Reinhart	Football and Wrestling	

== Varsity clubs ==
- Artistic Swimming
- Badminton
- Cheerleading
- Dance Pak
- Dragon Boat
- Equestrian
- Fastpitch
- Fencing
- Figure Skating
- Karate
- Nerf
- Ninjutsu
- Quidditch
- Ringette
- Rock Climbing
- Squash
- Table Tennis
- Tap Pak
- Tennis
- Ultimate
- Underwater Hockey
- Urban Hip Hop
- Waterpolo

== See also ==
- U Sports
- Guelph Athletics
