= Thunderbird Stadium =

Canadian Stadium

- T-Bird

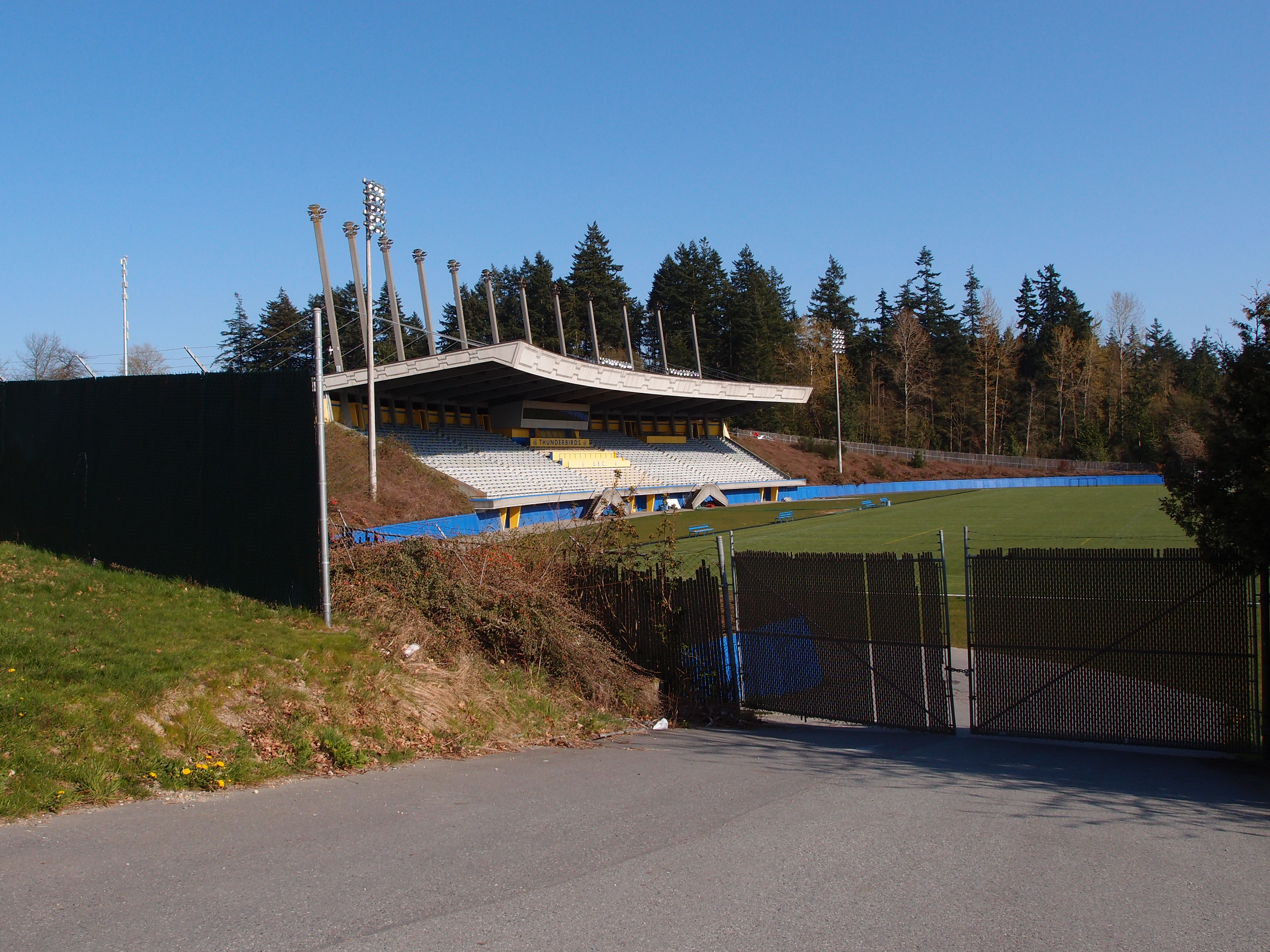
- View of the field and stands in 2011
- Interactive map of Thunderbird Stadium
- Address: 6288 Stadium Road; Vancouver, BC; Canada
- Coordinates: 49.2544°N 123.2455°W
- Owner: University of British Columbia
- Operator: UBC Athletics
- Capacity: 3,500 seats, 5,000 festival area, maximum 12,000 spectators.
- Type: Stadium
- Surface: PolyTan Turf
- Current use: Football; Soccer

Construction
- Opened: October 7, 1967; 58 years ago
- Cost: $1,236,188
- Architects: Vladimir Plavsic & Associates

Tenants
- UBC Thunderbirds teams: football, soccer; Vancouver Nighthawks (MLU) (2013–16); Vancouver Whitecaps FC 2 (USL) (2015–17); Nautsa’mawt FC (L1BC) (2022-23)

Website
- ubc.ca/thunderbird-stadium

Thunderbird Stadium is a stadium on the UBC Vancouver campus in British Columbia, Canada. It is located west of Vancouver's city limits, and is primarily used by the UBC Thunderbirds, the athletic program of UBC. It seats 3,500 in the main grandstand, plus grass seating for about 5,000 people on the west side and ends of the stadium, and by using the surrounding grass embankment the facility can accommodate up to 12,000 spectators.

The stadium was opened on October 7, 1967. It features 12 80-foot-high concrete support towers, all topped with concrete thunderbird statues created by renowned First Nations artist Bill Reid. Later renovations include the replacement of a few original benches with fold-down seating directly below the press box.

== History ==
=== Sports ===
The facility is also used for Canadian rugby union international matches, and the B.C. High School Rugby Championships. In 2009, the stadium was used to host the Ireland national rugby union team playing against the Canada national rugby union team.

Since 2006, the stadium has been used for Australian rules football matches, including the West Coast Challenge tournament, and in 2007 as the venue for Canada's international games against the United States and Japan which drew 2,500 spectators. In 2008, it became home to the Vancouver Cougars club.

In 2013, the Vancouver Nighthawks, a professional ultimate team competing in Major League Ultimate, became tenants of Thunderbird Stadium. A total of five home games were played at Thunderbird Stadium for both the team and the league's inaugural season. The team ceased operation when the Major League Ultimate (MLU) ceased all operations on December 21, 2016.

From 2015 to 2017, the USL soccer team, Whitecaps FC 2 (part of the Vancouver Whitecaps FC) played their home games at the stadium.

In June 2015, a Canadian Football League preseason game was to be held at the stadium on June 19, 2015, between the BC Lions and Edmonton Eskimos. This was due to Women's World Cup soccer being held at the Lions' usual home, BC Place.

The highest attendance for a Thunderbirds game at the stadium came on September 17, 2017, when UBC played their annual homecoming game in front of 9,542 fans, the third-highest attendance for a Canada West football game in History

The stadium served as the home ground for Nautsa'mawt FC, originally called Varsity FC, for their two year stint in League1 BC from 2021 to 2023. The Vancouver Whitecaps Academy team, alongside their female counterpart the Vancouver Rise Academy, currently play some of their BC Premier League matches at the venue.

=== Cultural events ===
The facility was also used for cultural events and rock festivals. However, with the installation of artificial turf in 2010, concerts are no longer permitted.

Thunderbird Stadium hosted Ozzfest, Lilith Fair, Lollapalooza, Area: One Festival, Another Roadside Attraction, and the Arts County Fair. It also held individual concerts including "Midnight Oil/Hunters & Collectors/Art Bergmann" in 1991. From 1995 into the 2000s it was used for the Vans Warped Tour. Up to 25,000 have attended individual concerts and/or festivals at the stadium.

This is also the location and team used in the hit TV series Psych, season 3 episode 13.
