= Sports in Toronto =

Overview of sports traditions and activities in Toronto, Ontario, Canada

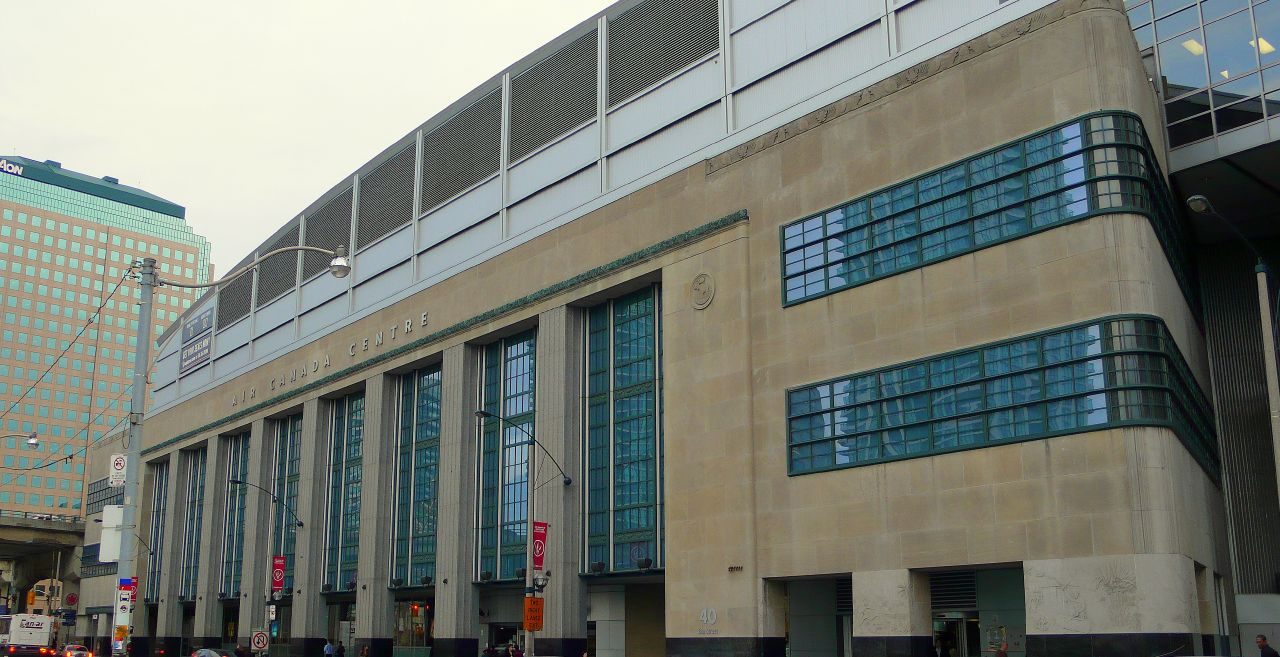
Scotiabank Arena is an indoor arena that hosts the Toronto Maple Leafs and the Toronto Raptors.

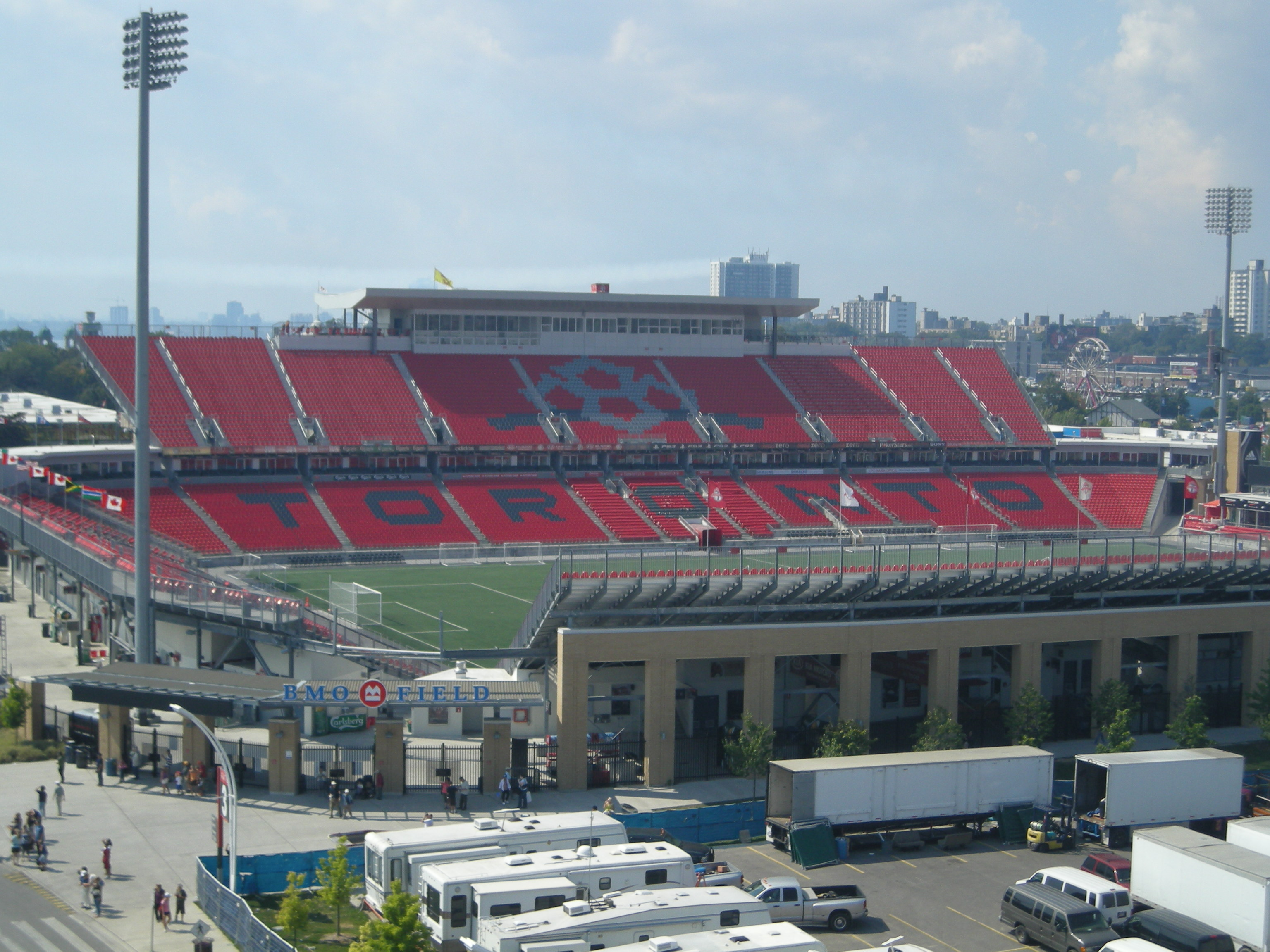
BMO Field in 2010, prior to renovations. The outdoor stadium hosts the Toronto Argonauts and Toronto FC.

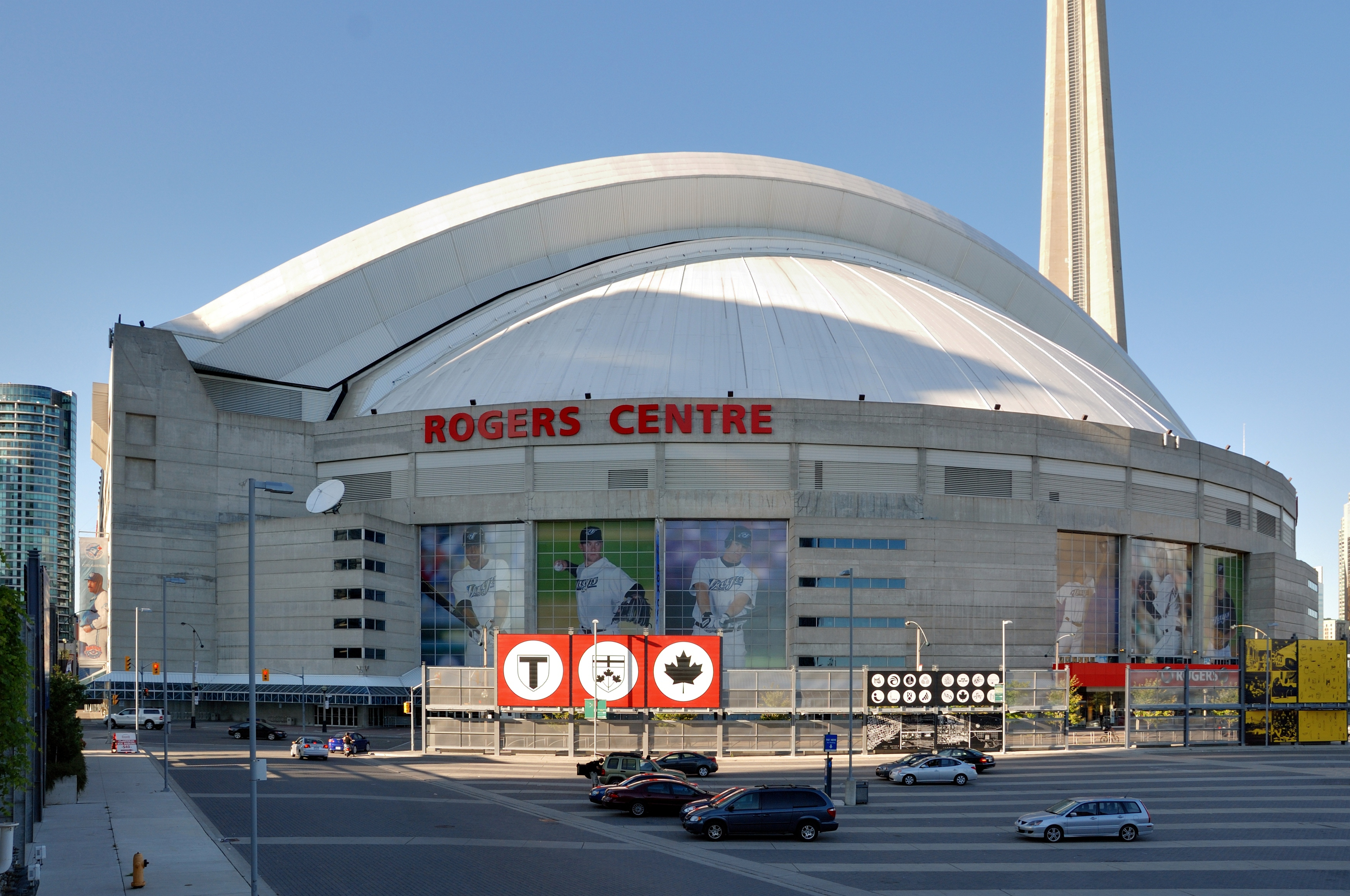
Rogers Centre is a retractable roof stadium that hosts the Toronto Blue Jays.

The city of Toronto, Ontario, Canada, has a long history of sport. It is home to a number teams in North American major professional leagues, as well as clubs such as the Granite Club (est. 1836), the Royal Canadian Yacht Club (est. 1852), the Toronto Cricket, Skating and Curling Club (est. pre-1827), the Argonaut Rowing Club (est. 1872), Toronto Argonauts football club (est. 1873), the Toronto Lawn Tennis Club (est. 1881), and the Badminton and Racquet Club (est. 1924). A number of heritage venues have developed in Toronto such as: Christie Pits (est. 1899), Coca-Cola Coliseum (est. 1921), Varsity Arena (est. 1926), and Maple Leaf Gardens (est. 1931). Toronto is also the location of the Hockey Hall of Fame and Canadian Football League's headquarters.

Toronto is notable among Canadian cities in sports for having several sports teams associated with American based professional leagues, particularly the most Canadian pro-sports teams in the major leagues.

== Sports clubs in Toronto ==
=== Professional teams ===
Toronto has teams in nearly every North American major professional league, including the Toronto Blue Jays (MLB), Toronto Argonauts (CFL), Toronto Raptors (NBA), Toronto FC (MLS) and Toronto Maple Leafs (NHL). Toronto is one of six North American cities (alongside Chicago, Los Angeles, Washington, D.C., Miami, and the New York Tri-state area) to have won titles in its five major leagues (MLB, NHL, NBA, MLS and either NFL or CFL), and the only one to have done so in the Canadian Football League.

The city also has teams in Prominent women's sports leagues in the United States and Canada, including the Toronto Sceptres (PWHL), Toronto Tempo (WNBA) and AFC Toronto (NSL).

Club	Sport	League	Venue	First season	Championships
Toronto Argonauts	Canadian football	Canadian Football League	BMO Field	1873 (Note: Founded in 1873 as the Toronto Football Club. The Argonauts became a professional sports team as a member of the Interprovincial Rugby Football Union in 1954, which marks the beginning of the modern era of Canadian football. The club is the oldest existing sports team in North America still using its original name, and they are the oldest-surviving team in the modern-day CFL.)	19 Grey Cups (last in 2024)
Toronto Maple Leafs	Ice hockey	National Hockey League	Scotiabank Arena	1917 (Note: The club was originally nicknamed the "Toronto Arenas/Torontos" in 1917, then changed their nickname to the "Toronto St. Patricks" in 1919. The club was finally rebranded to their current nickname, the "Toronto Maple Leafs" in 1927.)	13 Stanley Cups (last in 1967)
Toronto Maple Leafs	Baseball	Canadian Baseball League	Christie Pits	1969 (Note: The club was originally a semi-professional team from 1969–2025; it would play its first game as a professional team in 2026 in conjunction with the Intercounty Baseball League transitioning from a semi-pro league to a professional league while rebranding as the Canadian Baseball League.)	8 IBL Championships (last in 2007) (Note: At the time the Maple Leafs won their championships, the league was branded as the Intercounty Baseball League. The league rebranded as the Canadian Baseball League following the 2025 season as part of their transition from a semi-pro league to a professional league.)
Toronto Blue Jays	Baseball	Major League Baseball	Rogers Centre	1977	2 World Series (last in 1993)
Toronto Raptors	Basketball	National Basketball Association	Scotiabank Arena	1995	1 NBA Title (last in 2019)
Toronto Rock	Box lacrosse	National Lacrosse League	TD Coliseum (Note: Although the club is named the Toronto Rock, the club normally plays at TD Coliseum in Hamilton, Ontario representing the Greater Toronto and Hamilton Area.)	1999 (1998) (Note: The club was originally founded in 1998 as the Ontario Raiders before rebranding in 1999 as the Toronto Rock when they relocated to Toronto from 1999 to 2020.)	7 NLL Cups (last in 2026)
Toronto Marlies	Ice hockey	American Hockey League	Coca-Cola Coliseum (Note: Although Coca-Cola Coliseum is their primary home venue, approximately four of their regular season home games are played at Scotiabank Arena.)	2005 (1978) (Note: Although the club was established in Toronto in 2005, the club's history dates back to 1978, when it was founded as the New Brunswick Hawks (1978–82). The club later became the St. Catharines Saints (1982–1986), the Newmarket Saints (1986–91), and the St. John's Maple Leafs (1991–2005) before ultimately settling in Toronto.)	2 Calder Cups (Note: The club has won 3 Calder Cups, 2 of which were won while based in Toronto. An additional Calder Cup championship was won in 1982, when the club was based in Moncton, New Brunswick as the New Brunswick Hawks.) (last in 2026)
Toronto FC	Soccer	Major League Soccer	BMO Field	2007	1 MLS Cup (last in 2017) (Note: The club has also won 8 Voyageurs Cups (last in 2020) which is the domestic trophy awarded to the best professional soccer club in Canada by virtue of winning the annual Canadian Championship tournament. The winner is also awarded Canada's berth in the CONCACAF Champions League. In addition to winning the MLS Cup in 2017, the club also won the domestic treble by virtue of also winning the Supporters' Shield (for completing the MLS regular season with the best record overall as determined by the MLS points system) as well as winning the 2017 Canadian Championship.)
Toronto Rush	Ultimate	Ultimate Frisbee Association	Varsity Stadium	2013	1 AUDL Championship (last in 2013) (Note: At the time the Rush won their championship, the league was branded as the American Ultimate Disc League (AUDL). The league rebranded as the Ultimate Frisbee Association (UFA) following the 2023 season.)
Raptors 905	Basketball	NBA G League	Mississauga Sports and Entertainment Centre (Note: Although Mississauga Sports and Entertainment Centre in Mississauga, Ontario is their primary home venue, approximately four of their regular season home games are played at Scotiabank Arena.)	2015	1 D-League title (Note: At the time the Raptors 905 won their first championship, the league was branded as the NBA D-League. The league rebranded as the NBA G League the following season as part of a promotional partnership with Gatorade.)) (last in 2017)
Toronto FC II	Soccer	MLS Next Pro	York Lions Stadium	2015	0
Inter Toronto FC	Soccer	Canadian Premier League	York Lions Stadium	2019 (Note: The club was originally branded as "York9 FC" in 2019, followed by a rebranding to "York United FC" ahead of the 2021 CPL season. They were rebranded to their current name "Inter Toronto FC" ahead of the 2026 CPL season.)	0
Scarborough Shooting Stars	Basketball	Canadian Elite Basketball League	Toronto Pan Am Sports Centre	2022	1 CEBL Championship (last in 2023)
Toronto Polar Bears	Padel	Pro Padel League	N/A	2023	0
Toronto Sceptres	Ice hockey	Professional Women's Hockey League	Coca-Cola Coliseum	2024	0
AFC Toronto	Soccer	Northern Super League	BMO Field, York Lions Stadium (Note: AFC Toronto split their home schedule equally between both venues)	2025	0
Toronto Sixers	T10 cricket	Canada Super60	N/A	2025	1 Super60 Championship (last in 2026)
Toronto Kings	T20 Cricket	Global T20 Canada	N/A	2026	1 GT20 Championship (last in 2026)
Toronto North	Tennis	World TeamTennis	Coca-Cola Coliseum	2026	0
Toronto Tempo	Basketball	Women's National Basketball Association	Coca-Cola Coliseum	2026	0

The Raptors 905 is an NBA G League basketball team that primarily plays home games at the Mississauga Sports and Entertainment Centre in the neighbouring city of Mississauga, although they do play occasional home games at Scotiabank Arena in Toronto. The Raptors 905 was named after the 905 area code used by the metropolitan area surrounding the City of Toronto.

The Toronto Rock is a National Lacrosse League team is based outside the city limits of Toronto, but is located within the Greater Toronto and Hamilton Area (GTHA). The team played their home games in Toronto from 1999 to 2021, when it relocated to TD Coliseum in Hamilton, Ontario. Although the team is no longer physically based Toronto, the team continues to use Toronto as a part of its moniker; claiming that the Rock represents the entire province, and the GTHA in particular. For the 2025 NLL season, the Toronto Rock returned to the Greater Toronto Area to play their home games at the Paramount Fine Foods Centre in Mississauga while TD Coliseum undergoes renovations.

Rogers Communications operates the Toronto Blue Jays baseball team through Rogers Blue Jays Baseball Partnership and the Rogers Centre. Rogers Communications also own 75 per cent of Maple Leaf Sports & Entertainment, which itself owns the Toronto Maple Leafs, Toronto Raptors, Toronto Argonauts, and Toronto FC of Major League Soccer, as well as their minor league farm teams, the Toronto Marlies of the American Hockey League (AHL), Raptors 905 of the NBA G League and Toronto FC II of MLS Next Pro.

=== Semi-professional and amateur teams ===
Club	Sport	League	Venue	First season	Championships
Serbian White Eagles	Soccer	Canadian Soccer League	Rob Ford Stadium	1968	3 (last in 2024)
FC Ukraine United	Soccer	Canadian Soccer League	Centennial Park Stadium	2006	0
FC Continentals	Soccer	Canadian Soccer League	Centennial Park Stadium	2008 (2022) (Note: The club was originally founded in 2008 as FC Vorkuta before rebranding in 2022 as FC Continentals when they relocated to Toronto.)	3 (last in 2022)
TFC Academy	Soccer	MLS Next	BMO Training Ground	2008	1 Inter-Provincial Cup (soccer) (last in 2014)
Scarborough SC	Soccer	Canadian Soccer League	Birchmount Stadium	2014	2 (last in 2021)
Master's Futbol	Soccer	Ontario Premier League	L'Amoreaux Sports Complex	2014	1 (last in 2019)
North Toronto Nitros	Soccer	Ontario Premier League	Downsview Turf	2016	0
Alliance United FC	Soccer	Ontario Premier League	Turf Sports Field	2018	1 (last in 2023)
Toronto Raiders	Quadball	Major League Quadball	Esther Shiner Stadium	2019	0
The Borough FC	Soccer	Ontario Premier League	Birchmount Stadium	2024	0
Inter Toronto Pathway	Soccer	Ontario Premier League	York Lions Stadium	2024	0
Canadian Crusaders	Indoor soccer	Major League Indoor Soccer	Scarborough Soccer Centre	2024	0
Toronto 6ixers	Inline hockey	Professional Inline Hockey Association	N/A	2025	0

=== Professional esports teams ===
The Toronto Ultra have competed in the Call of Duty League since 2020, playing at Mattamy Athletic Centre.

=== Post-secondary athletics ===
==== Universities ====
Three public universities in Toronto operate a varsity program. They include Toronto Metropolitan University and the TMU Bold (est. 1948), the University of Toronto and the Varsity Blues (est. 1877), and York University and the York Lions (est. 1968). The athletic programs of the three universities are a part of the Ontario University Athletics program, which itself is a member of U Sports.

The University of Guelph-Humber is a jointly operated post-secondary institution in Toronto between the University of Guelph (based in Guelph), and Humber College, and does not maintain its athletic programs. However, students attending Guelph-Humber can participate in the varsity programs of Guelph-Humber's parent institutions, including the Guelph Gryphons, or the Humber Hawks.

Two independent public universities based in Toronto do not operate a competitive athletics program, OCAD University, and the Université de l'Ontario français. Tyndale University, a private university and seminary in Toronto, maintains several student athletic clubs, although these teams do not compete at a varsity level.

==== Colleges ====
There are presently four public colleges in Toronto that operate a competitive athletics program. They include Centennial College's Centennial Colts, George Brown College's George Brown Huskies, Humber College's Humber Hawks, and the Seneca College's Seneca Sting. All four college varsity programs are members of the Ontario Colleges Athletic Association; which itself is a member of the Canadian Collegiate Athletic Association.

Students of Collège Boréal's Toronto campus are also able to compete for that college's athletic programs; although most of the athletic facilities for the Collège Boréal Vipères is based outside Toronto, at the university's main campus in Greater Sudbury.

=== Junior sports clubs ===
==== Canadian football ====
- GTA Grizzlies

==== Ice hockey ====
- Toronto Jr. Canadiens
- Toronto Patriots
- St. Michael's Buzzers
- North York Rangers

=== Social sporting clubs ===
There are several social athletics and sporting clubs in Toronto. They include:

- Argonaut Rowing Club
- Granite Club
- High Park Club
- Lambton Golf and Country Club
- Oakdale Golf & Country Club
- Rosedale Golf Club
- Scarboro Golf and Country Club
- St. George's Golf and Country Club
- Toronto Cricket, Skating and Curling Club
- Toronto Hunt Club
- Toronto Lawn Tennis Club
- Weston Golf and Country Club

== Sports venues ==
There are several sporting venues used in Toronto that host professional sport teams and major events. Many of these venues are multi-purpose and can host a variety of sports. However, a select number of venues are dedicated to hosting only a specific type of sport.

Several venues are located near one another, like in Exhibition Place, whose grounds are also used as a race course for the Honda Indy Toronto and the Toronto Marathon. The Discovery District and York University Heights are neighbourhoods that also hold several sporting venues, most of which were built by the University of Toronto and York University respectively.

=== Venues used by professional teams and events ===
The following is a list of sporting venues in Toronto that either host professional sports teams or major national or international events:

Venue	Opened	Locale	Capacity	Events/professional teams
BMO Field	2007	Exhibition Place	30,991 (Note: Capable of being expanded to 40,000)	Toronto Argonauts; Toronto FC; AFC Toronto
Coca-Cola Coliseum	1921	Exhibition Place	8,140 (Note: The following figure is the venue's capacity when fitted to host a professional team. The venue's capacity may differ when configured for other sports and non-professional teams.)	Toronto Sceptres; Raptors Uprising GC; Toronto Marlies; Toronto Tempo
Mattamy Athletic Centre	2012 (Note: Mattamy Athletic Centre forms the upper levels of Maple Leaf Gardens, a former arena that was converted into a multi-use structure in the 2010s. A smaller arena was opened in its upper levels in 2012.)	Church and Wellesley	3,850	Toronto Ultra
Rogers Centre	1989	Entertainment District	39,150	Toronto Blue Jays
Scotiabank Arena	1999	South Core	18,800 (ice hockey) (Note: Standing room is not factored); 19,8000 (basketball)	Toronto Maple Leafs; Toronto Raptors
Sobeys Stadium	2004	York University Heights	12,500	Canadian Open (tennis)
Toronto Pan Am Sports Centre	2014	Highland Creek	2,000	Scarborough Shooting Stars
York Lions Stadium	2015	York University Heights	4,000	Toronto FC II; York United FC; AFC Toronto
Woodbine Racetrack	1956	Rexdale	42,000	Canadian Triple Crown

==== Practice facilities ====
Several professional teams also maintain a practice facility. As opposed to arenas and stadiums, these facilities are dedicated to the practice and training of professional athletes. These facilities are typically not used to host official games or events. Some professional teams do not have a dedicated practice facility and instead utilize other existing facilities, like the Toronto Argonauts with Coca-Cola Coliseum (weight rooms) and Lamport Stadium (practice field). The Toronto Tempo will construct a practice facility for themselves by Exhibition Place that will open by 2028; they will hold their practices at the Goldring Centre for High Performance Sport in the interim.

The following are practice facilities in Toronto used by professional teams:

Venue	Opened	Locale	Club tenant
BMO Training Ground	2012	Downsview	Toronto FC; Toronto FC II
Ford Performance Centre	2009	New Toronto	Toronto Maple Leafs; Toronto Marlies; Toronto Sceptres
OVO Athletic Centre	2016	Exhibition Place	Toronto Raptors

==== Demolished arenas and stadiums ====
The following is a list of arenas and stadiums that hosted professional teams, but were later demolished:

Venue	Opened	Closed	Locale	Sports hosted
Diamond Park	1900	1908	Liberty Village	Baseball
Exhibition Stadium	1959	1996	Exhibition Place	Baseball and football
Hanlan's Point Stadium	1897	1937	Toronto Islands	Baseball
Maple Leaf Stadium	1925	1968	Harbourfront	Baseball and football
Mutual Street Arena	1912	1989	Garden District	Ice hockey (later converted to curling and roller skating)
Mutual Street Rink	1875	1910	Garden District	Curling, ice hockey and skating
Sunlight Park	1886	1913	Riverdale	Baseball

=== Community multi-purpose sports venues ===
Several multi-purpose sports venues are open to the community and are operated by the municipal government of Toronto or a private sporting club. Regular access to these venues is provided for the public, although several multi-purpose sports venues are owned by private sporting clubs, and may require membership for access to its facilities. In addition to the public, several semi-professional sports and amateur teams also make use of these community venues.

The following is a list of multi-purpose sports venues in Toronto that are used by the community. Venues dedicated to a specific sport, like bowling alleys, curling rinks, golf courses, and ice hockey rinks are not included:

Venue	Opened	Locale	Management
Birchmount Stadium	1964	Birch Cliff	Municipal government of Toronto
Carnegie Centennial Centre	1966	Westminster-Branson	Municipal government of Toronto
Centennial Park Stadium	1975	Eringate-Centennial-West Deane	Municipal government of Toronto
Esther Shiner Stadium	1984	Westminster-Branson	Municipal government of Toronto
High Park Club	1911	High Park	High Park Club
Lambton Golf and Country Club	1902	Rockcliffe–Smythe	Lambton Golf and Country Club
Monarch Park Stadium	1964	East Danforth	Toronto District School Board
Oakdale Golf & Country Club	1926	Downsview	Oakdale Golf & Country Club
Rosedale Field	1874	Rosedale	Municipal government of Toronto
Ted Reeve Community Arena	1954	Upper Beaches	Municipal government of Toronto
Toronto Track and Field Centre	1979	York University Heights	Municipal government of Toronto
Toronto Cricket, Skating and Curling Club Ground	1930	Bedford Park	Toronto Cricket, Skating and Curling Club

==== University athletics venues ====
Universities in Toronto manage several sports facilities for their students, varsity programs, and athletic clubs. These venues are also utilized by several other sports clubs in Toronto, with notable examples being the Mattamy Athletic Centre and York Lions Stadium, both of which serve as hosts to professional teams. Some university varsity teams practice and play in community venues or parks, like TMU Bold's varsity soccer teams, which play at Downsview Park.

The following is a list of sporting venues in Toronto operated by universities:

Venue	Opened	Locale	University
Alumni Field	1994	York University Heights	York University
Back Campus Fields	2014	Discovery District	University of Toronto
Dan Lang Field	2007	West Hill	University of Toronto
Goldring Centre for High Performance Sport	2014	Discovery District	University of Toronto
Mattamy Athletic Centre	2012	Church and Wellesley	Toronto Metropolitan University
NFP Athletic Centre	1996	York University Heights	York University
Tait McKenzie Centre	1966	York University Heights	York University
Toronto Pan Am Sports Centre	2014	Highland Creek	University of Toronto
Varsity Arena	1926	Discovery District	University of Toronto
Varsity Stadium	2007	Discovery District	University of Toronto
York Lions Stadium	2015	York University Heights	York University

== History by sport ==
=== Australian rules football ===
Toronto currently has seven different Australian rules football teams called the Broadview Hawks, High Park Demons, Central Blues, Etobicoke Kangaroos, Lakeshore Rebels, Toronto Downtown Dingos, and the Toronto Eagles. In addition to teams based in Toronto, two teams from the AFL Ontario are also based within the Greater Golden Horseshoe, the Hamilton Wildcats and the Grand River Gargoyles. Some of these organizations operate a men's and women's team.

=== Auto racing ===
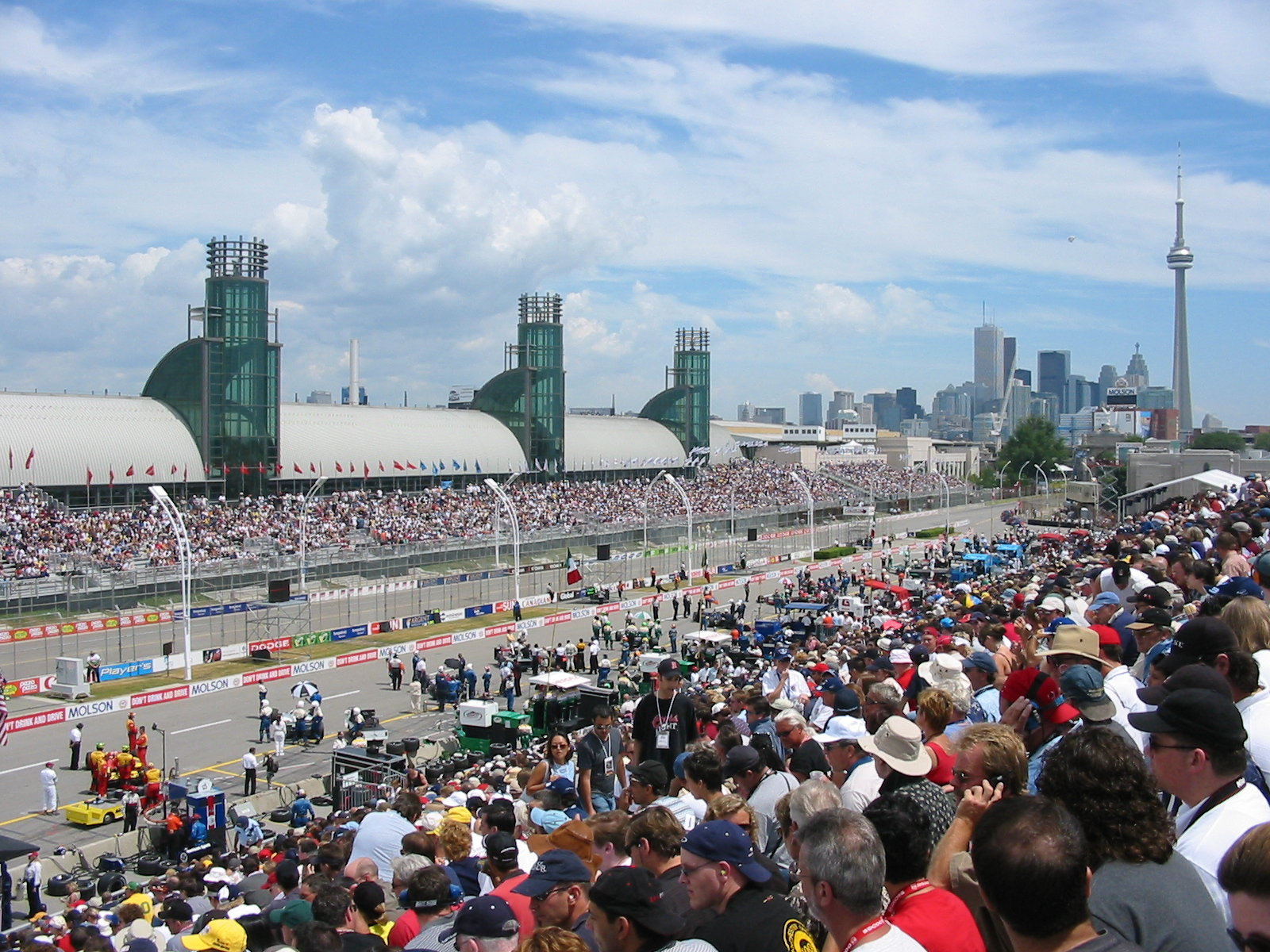
The Honda Indy Toronto at Exhibition Place.

The Honda Indy Toronto was an IndyCar Series race, held annually in July on a temporary street circuit. The start/finish line was located on Princes' Boulevard, slightly west of Newfoundland Drive. From the Start/Finish line, drivers headed East towards the Princes' Gates, turning right (south) onto Canada Boulevard before reaching the gate. From Canada Boulevard, the track went right onto Lake Shore Boulevard (west) which included the longest straightaway on the circuit, running through Exhibition Place and on Lake Shore Boulevard. Drivers re-entered the Exhibition grounds at Ontario Drive, heading north towards Prince's Boulevard where they turned left (west). The circuit continued on to Manitoba Drive and headed north-east then east until reaching Nova Scotia Avenue. At Nova Scotia Avenue, drivers turned right (south) then navigated a left-right-left series of turns until rejoining Prince's Boulevard and heading east towards the start/finish line.

The city has hosted the race for over thirty years. During its final run in 2025, it was IndyCar's second-longest running street race, only behind the Grand Prix of Long Beach and the fourth oldest race on the current IndyCar schedule in terms of number of races run.

In September 2025, it was announced that the event would be moved to the city of Markham, Ontario for the 2026 season as part of a 5-year deal for the IndyCar Series at Markham Centre.

Historically, the city played host to the 1958 Jim Mideon 500, a NASCAR Cup Series racing event at Exhibition Stadium. Legendary NASCAR driver Lee Petty won this race, defeating his son Richard in the latter's Cup Series debut.

Canadian Tire Motorsports Park, formerly known as Mosport Park, is located approximately 100 km east of Toronto in the community of Bowmanville. The venue holds the unique distinction in motorsport of having hosted Formula One, IndyCar, NASCAR, Can-Am, MotoGP and World Superbike events. The track hosts Canada's largest annual sportscar race, the Mobil 1 SportsCar Grand Prix part of the IMSA WeatherTech SportsCar Championship, the NASCAR Camping World Truck Series Chevrolet Silverado 250, the NASCAR Pinty's Series, the Pirelli World Challenge and the Canadian Superbike Championship along with other events. The track was the original home of Formula One's Canadian Grand Prix from 1961 to 1977 (except for 1968 and 1970).

=== Baseball ===
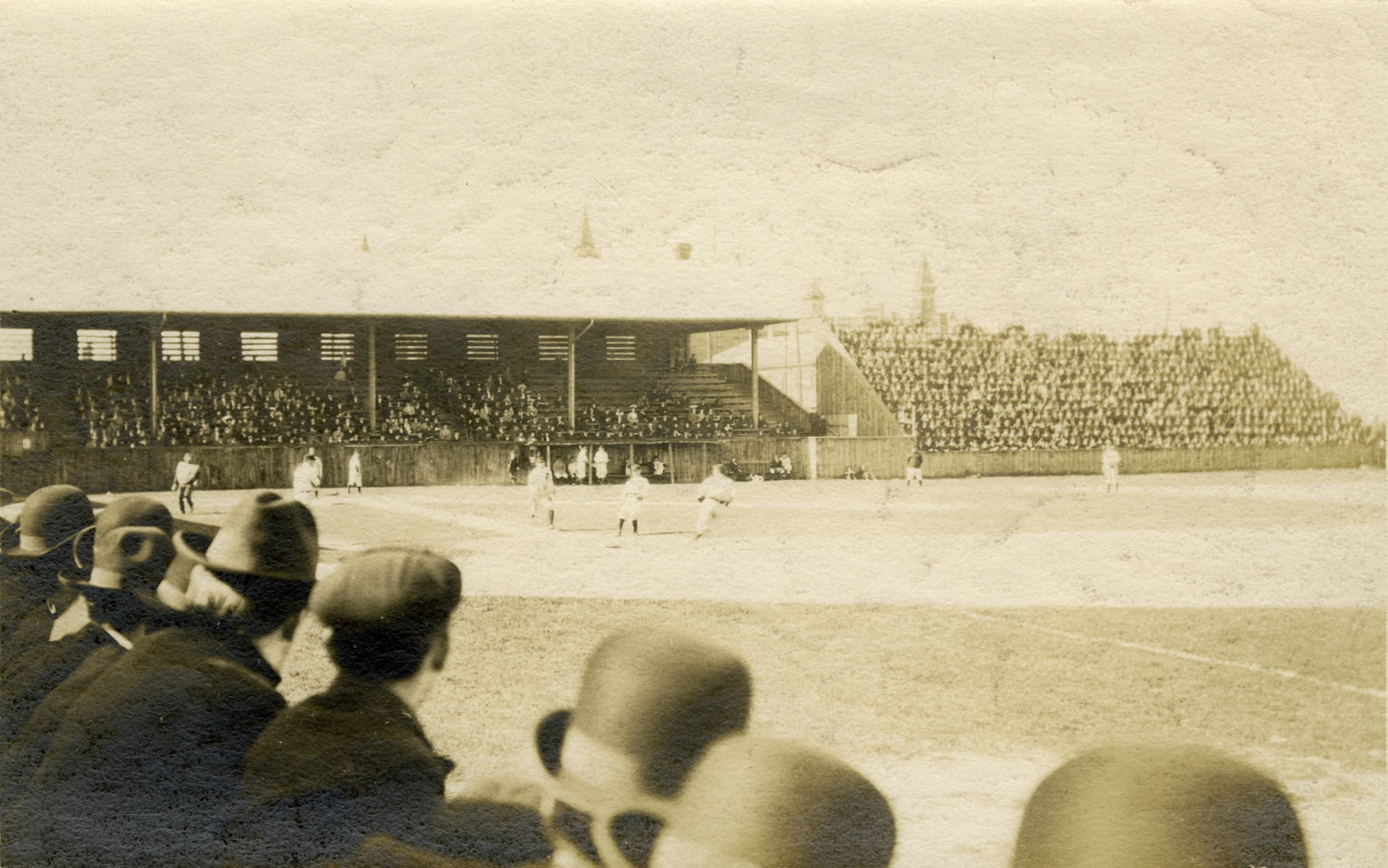
Diamond Park was the fourth home of the Toronto Maple Leafs baseball team. The team was founded in 1895 and was a member of the International League.

Professional baseball has had a presence in the city at the minor league level since 1896 with the Toronto Maple Leafs of the AAA International League. It was in a game against the Leafs on September 4, 1914, at Hanlan's Point Stadium where Babe Ruth hit his first professional home run while also pitching a complete game one-hitter for the visiting Providence Grays. A year after the conclusion of his MLB career, hall of famer Nap Lajoie served as player manager for the Maple Leafs in 1917, winning the International League's batting title with a .380 average at 42 years of age, while also managing his team to the league's championship in his only season with the team. In 1926, hall of fame pitcher Carl Hubbell was assigned to the Maple Leafs, and finished the season with a 7–7 record on that championship winning team. In 1943, hall of fame hitter Ralph Kiner was assigned to play with the Maple Leafs, but left the team after a few weeks upon being called to duty by the U.S. Navy. Hall of famer Sparky Anderson was also a member of the Leafs as both a player (1960–1963) and a manager (1964).

Toronto interests long pursued a major league team for the city. Toronto was proposed as the home for a National League (NL) team by Albert Spalding when he was established the league in 1876. Exhibition games were played by both the NL and American League (AL) of Major League Baseball (MLB) in Toronto in the 1910s. Member of Parliament Bernard Rickart Hepburn was granted a Toronto franchise by the Federal League, a rival major league to the NL and AL, for its inaugural season in 1914, after the franchise was revoked from Cleveland. After speculation the franchise would be returned to Cleveland or moved to Cincinnati, it was transferred to Brooklyn to become the Brooklyn Tip-Tops prior to playing a game in Toronto. Hepburn cited his inability to find a park to play at in short notice as the reason the team didn't launch. However, he secured an agreement with the league which granted him the rights to a team for the following season. Though Toronto would be proposed as the new home to the Kansas City Packers Federal League franchise for the 1915 season, no team ever came to fruition in the city.

Toronto interests put forward a bid to buy the Washington Nationals to move them to Toronto in 1918 when there was discussion of the team relocating. The following year it was reported that there were plans for the Boston Red Sox, Chicago White Sox and New York Yankees, which were dissatisfied with the President of the AL Ban Johnson, to break away and form their own new major league, which would include Toronto. In 1922 a Toronto group attempted to purchase the Boston Red Sox to relocate them to Toronto. The owner of the Boston Braves, Lou Perini, tried to sell his team to Toronto interests in the early 1950s before relocating them to become the Milwaukee Braves. While owning the Maple Leafs baseball team, Jack Kent Cooke set his sights on bringing MLB to Toronto. He made a bid on the St. Louis Browns in 1953, but the team was sold to a competing group which relocated them to become the Baltimore Orioles the following season. The AL considered Toronto as a potential home for the Philadelphia Athletics before they became the Kansas City Athletics in 1955, after Cooke bid on them, but the city's lack of a major league venue was an obstacle to acquiring a team. Cooke unsuccessfully bid on the Detroit Tigers in 1956, reportedly to move them to Toronto. In 1957 he submitted a bid for a NL expansion team for Toronto. In 1958, Cooke offered to withdraw from Toronto if the Los Angeles Dodgers, who were considering relocating, moved to the city, in exchange for partial ownership of the club. That same year it was reported that Toronto was one of the cities that the owner of the Washington Senators was considering relocating his team to. In 1959 Cooke became one of the founding owners in the Continental League, a proposed third major league of baseball, getting a team for Toronto for a fee of $50,000, but the league disbanded a year later without ever staging a game. Cooke later applied to the AL for a Toronto expansion team in 1960, but found the expansion terms too onerous, and considered purchasing the Cincinnati Reds for Toronto in 1961 after their owner died.

In 1967, with mounting losses, the owner of the baseball Maple Leafs sough a buyer to keep the team in Toronto. Maple Leaf Gardens Limited, owner of the Maple Leafs of the NHL, considered purchasing the team, but the deal ultimately fell apart due to concerns about the team's home, Maple Leaf Stadium, which needed up to $250,000 in repairs and whose owner wanted $4 million to purchase it. Harold Ballard, part owner of MLGL, said that the company's interest was due in part to help position itself to go after an MLB franchise for Toronto. The team was subsequently relocated out of Toronto to Louisville, Kentucky.

In 1967, a Toronto group was one of six to submit a bid for a NL expansion team. In 1971, Howard Webster, chairman of The Globe and Mail, made an offer to purchase the San Diego Padres and relocate them to Toronto but it was refused. In early 1974, MLGL announced plans to build a new baseball stadium in Toronto, however the city ultimately decided later that year to a CA$2.8 million renovation of Exhibition Stadium to make it suitable for baseball.

Later that year a group called Canadian Baseball Co. led by Sydney Cooper submitted an application to both the AL and NL for a franchise. Cooper had previously been part of Webster's group. At the time it was reported that there were at least four groups bidding for a Toronto team, including ones led by Labatt Brewing Company, MLGL and Robert Hunter, the former President of the International League Maple Leafs, in addition to Canadian Baseball Co. Lorne Duguid, vice-president of Hiram Walker Distillers and MLGL executive, led MLGL's bid.

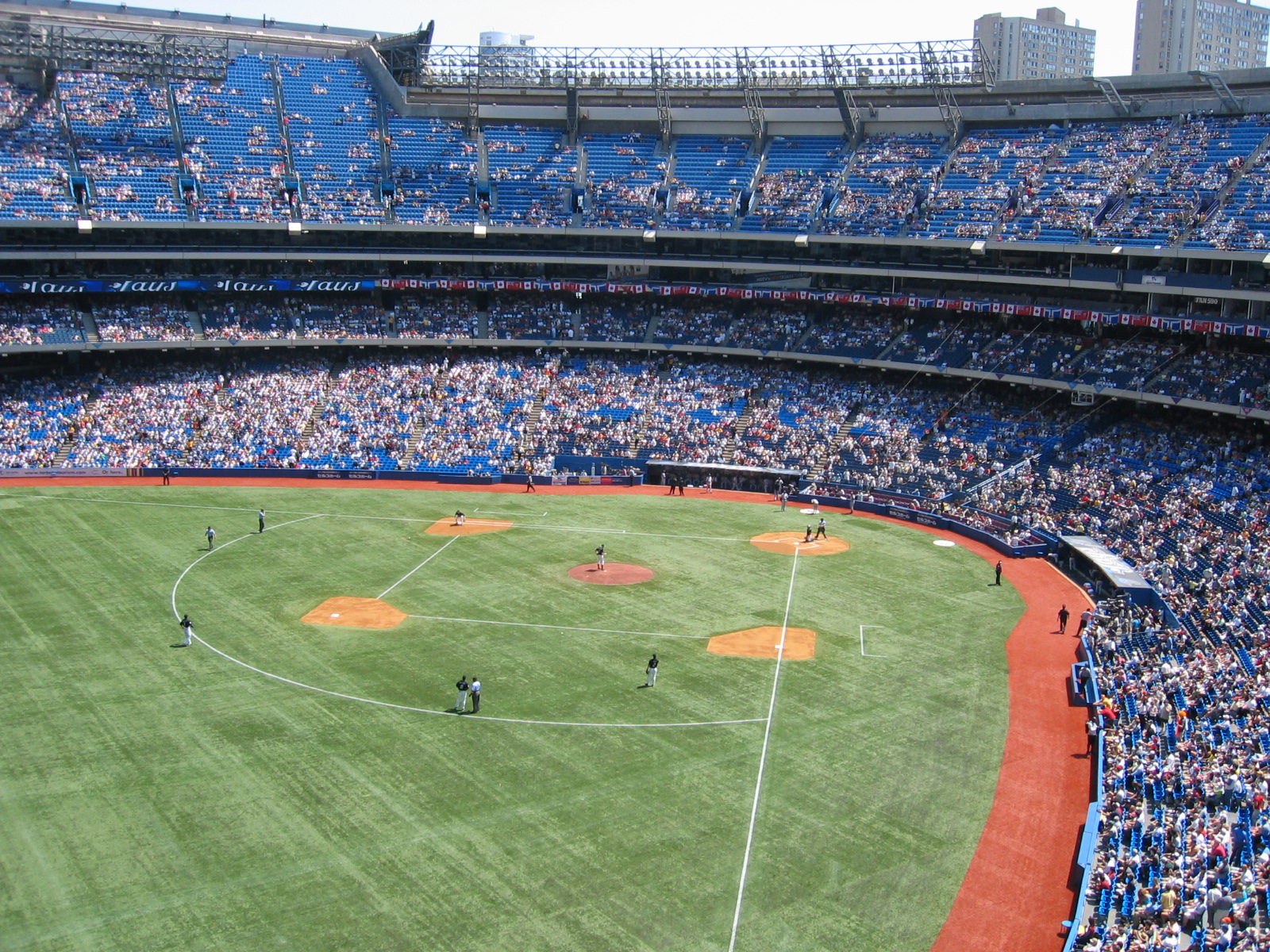
Inside the Rogers Centre. A game between the New York Yankees and Toronto Blue Jays. The team moved into the stadium in 1989.

In 1975, the owner of the Baltimore Orioles stated that he was in negotiations to sell his team to a Toronto group. The following January, San Francisco Giants owner Horace Stoneham agreed to sell the team for $13.25 million to a group headed by Labatt, which also included Vulcan Assets Ltd. (owned by Webster) and Canadian Imperial Bank of Commerce (CIBC), intending to relocate it to Toronto. The team would have begun play in the 1976 season at Exhibition Stadium, and be called the Toronto Giants. However the plan to move the Giants was quashed by a U.S. court. The MLGL group also bid on the Giants, with Ballard stating that they had offered $15 million for the team, after having previously negotiated with the owners of the Baltimore Orioles, Chicago White Sox, Cleveland Indians and Oakland Athletics in their attempt to acquire a team for Toronto.

MLB decided to expand in 1976 to settle a lawsuit filed by the local governments in Seattle, Washington against the American League for breach of contract, due to the relocation in 1970 of their Seattle Pilots to Milwaukee after only one season. To keep the league with an even number of teams with the addition of a new Seattle expansion franchise, a formal expansion proceeding was held. While the Labatt group initially pursued a NL expansion team, but when the NL only agreed to consider expanding in March 1976, while the AL voted to grant Toronto a team, they switched gears. A second Toronto group backed by Carling O'Keefe also applied for the AL expansion team. Less than a week later, the AL awarded the team to the group comprising Labatt Breweries (45%), Webster (45%), and the Canadian Imperial Bank of Commerce (CIBC) (10%), for $7 million. A few days later the NL had their own vote on expanding to Toronto and Washington, but while receiving a majority support of 10–2 it failed to pass due to lack of unanimity and was put off for two weeks. The NL objected to the AL's expansion in to Toronto, arguing that the NL was a better match for the city with a natural rivalry with the Montreal Expos, and asked baseball commissioner Bowie Kuhn to intervene so they could reconsider their own expansion plans. Kuhn, who preferred Toronto get a NL expansion team while the second AL expansion team be awawrded to New Orleans, requested a moratorium on the AL's expansion plans. However, after a second non-unanimous vote by the NL on expanding to Toronto left Toronto uncontested to the AL.

The Toronto Blue Jays' inaugural campaign was in 1977 with Exhibition Stadium chosen as the site for the team's home games. Built in the 1950s, it was rebuilt in 1976 to satisfy the requirements for baseball. In 1989, the team moved to the newly built SkyDome (now known as the Rogers Centre). Although the team performed poorly, placing last in the American League East for each of its first three years, successful drafting and team management resulted in improved performance that led to the team's first pennant in 1985, and culminated with consecutive World Series victories in 1992 and 1993. The Blue Jays would return to the World Series in 2025.

The city is also home to the Toronto Maple Leafs baseball club of the Canadian Baseball League. From 1969 to 2025, the team operated as a semi-professional sports team, but will operate as a professional sports team from 2026 onward.

Toronto has also hosted parts of the 2009 World Baseball Classic.

=== Basketball ===
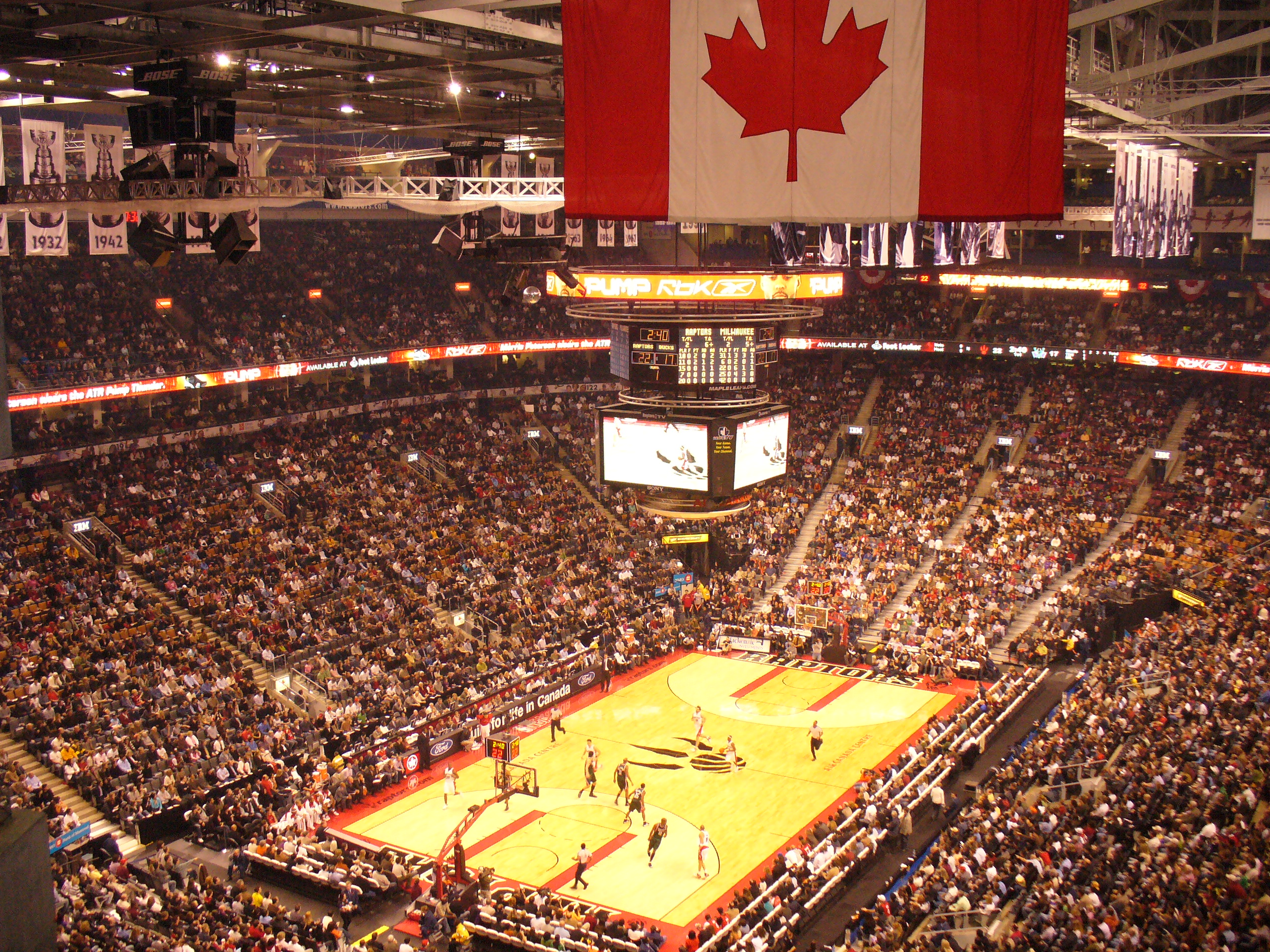
Inside the Air Canada Centre, the Toronto Raptors play the Milwaukee Bucks. The Raptors moved into the arena in 1999.

Basketball is among the fastest growing sports in Toronto and is the most popular sport among the city's youth and millennials. Although not as historically entrenched in Toronto culture as other sports, basketball does have significant milestones in the city. The first major professional basketball game in the city was an exhibition between the Fort Wayne Zollner Pistons and Rochester Royals of the National Basketball League at the Gardens in 1946. The first game of the professional Basketball Association of America, forerunner of the National Basketball Association (NBA), was contested at Maple Leaf Gardens (MLG) between the Toronto Huskies and the New York Knickerbockers on November 1, 1946. However, the Huskies folded after the league's inaugural season following losses thought to total $60,000. Numerous exhibition and regular season NBA and American Basketball Association (ABA) games were held at both MLG and SkyDome over the years, including a total of 16 regular season Buffalo Braves games at MLG from 1971 to 1975 in an attempt to gauge the city's interest in a full-time team.

Ruby Richman, the former coach of Canada's national basketball team, working with the head of Maple Leaf Gardens Limited (MLGL) Harold Ballard, pursued a number of existing ABA and NBA teams to relocate to the city in the 1970s. Richman had a tentative agreement to purchase both the Miami Floridians and Pittsburgh Condors of the ABA with the plan to merge them into a single Toronto-based team, but the deal fell through. Later Richman held negotiations with the Detroit Pistons, which were seeking $5 million for the franchise, but pulled out when the price was raised to $8.25 million. MLGL attempted to purchase the Braves for $8.5 million and relocate them to Toronto in 1974, and again several times later, with Carling O'Keefe also considering purchasing the team in 1976, but the owners eventually chose to move the team to San Diego.

When Toronto was awarded an expansion NBA franchise in 1974 for the 1975–76 season MLGL was one of three groups to bid for the rights to the team, but the club never materialized since no group was able to secure funding for the expansion fee of at least $6.15 million. MLGL attempted to purchase and relocate the Houston Rockets in 1975, which were seeking $8 million for the team, but the teams lease ultimately prevented a relocation. In 1976, MLGL attempted to buy the Atlanta Hawks. In 1979, a Toronto group which included Ballard again pushed for an expansion franchise, but lost out to the Dallas Mavericks.

Toronto interests considered purchasing and relocating the Kansas City Kings in 1979. In 1983, Cleveland Cavaliers owner Ted Stepien stated that "the chances are 999-to-1" that his team would be relocated and renamed the Toronto Towers, playing their games in MLG, with Carling O'Keefe thought to be involved financially in the deal, but he ultimately sold it to a local group. A Toronto group which included Bill Ballard, son of Harold, and Basketball Hall of Famer Wilt Chamberlain submitted an application and $100,000 deposit for an NBA expansion franchise for MLG in 1986, but of the six cities to apply Toronto was not one of the four which were successful. Larry Tanenbaum attempted to purchase and relocate the Denver Nuggets to Toronto in 1991, but the team could not get out of its lease at the McNichols Arena. Tanenbaum later pursued the New Jersey Nets and San Antonio Spurs unsuccessfully. Ultimately, the NBA awarded an expansion franchise to John Bitove, over Tanenbaum's group which had partnered with the Maple Leafs and a third group led by Bill Ballard and Michael Cohl which included Magic Johnson, and the Toronto Raptors joined the NBA for the 1995–96 season, giving the city its own team once again. The franchise was one of two Canadian expansion teams announced by the NBA in 1993, the other being the Vancouver Grizzlies, which moved south of the border to Memphis after the 2000–01 season.

The Toronto Tornados of the minor league Continental Basketball Association played in the city from 1983 to 1985 before being relocated to Pensacola, Florida in the middle of their third season to become the Pensacola Tornados.

Toronto has also hosted parts of the 1994 FIBA World Championship tournament alongside Hamilton, Ontario from August 4 to 14, 1994. The tournament was held at SkyDome and Maple Leaf Gardens in Toronto as well as at Copps Coliseum in Hamilton. The hosting duties were originally awarded to Belgrade, Yugoslavia, but after United Nations limited participation in sporting events in Yugoslavia, Toronto stepped in as a replacement option in 1992. This also marked the first time that this tournament would allow current American NBA players that had already played in an official NBA regular season game to participate. Prior to that only professionals from other leagues were allowed to compete, since players from other leagues were still considered amateurs. The tournament was won by the United States's Dream Team II, who beat Russia 137–91 in the Final at SkyDome.

Since 2015, Toronto has hosted the BioSteel All-Canadian Basketball Game, an annual all-star game showcasing the country's top high school basketball players of the year, at the Goldring Centre for High Performance Sport on the campus of the University of Toronto.

Toronto hosted the 2016 NBA All-Star Game weekend February 12–14, 2016. The All-Star Weekend events were held at Air Canada Centre and Ricoh Coliseum. This marked the first time that an NBA All-Star Weekend was ever hosted outside the United States.

On July 27, 2018, Scotiabank Arena hosted week 6 of the 2018 Big3 season. The Big3 is a professional 3x3 basketball league founded by Ice Cube comprising eight teams, each featuring rosters of retired NBA players, with all league games played in one session as a quadruple-header. Toronto is the lone non-American venue city to host a Big3 event.

The Toronto Raptors hosted their first ever NBA Finals in 2019 vs. the Golden State Warriors. Game 1, which was played on May 30, 2019, at Scotiabank Arena, marked the first ever NBA Finals game to be held outside the United States. On June 13, 2019, the Raptors defeated the Warriors in Game 6 at Oracle Arena in Oakland, California, to win their first ever Larry O'Brien Championship Trophy, which was also the first ever NBA championship won by a team based outside of the United States.

On August 15, 2021, the Scarborough Shooting Stars were announced as one of two new expansion teams for the CEBL, & the first franchise to be based in the Greater Toronto Area. They played their first ever CEBL game on May 26, 2022, in Guelph, Ontario vs. the Guelph Nighthawks, and played their first ever home game on June 4, 2022, vs. the Hamilton Honey Badgers at the Toronto Pan Am Sports Centre.

On May 13, 2023, Scotiabank Arena hosted a preseason WNBA game between the Minnesota Lynx & the Chicago Sky with the Sky defeating the Lynx 82–74. This marked the first ever WNBA game of any sort to have been played in Canada, and it was played before a sold-out crowd of 19,800. WNBA commissioner Cathy Engelbert remarked that the league was "thrilled with the reception" and that Toronto "scored really well" and "is very high on the list" of about 10 cities for potential expansion. On May 23, 2024, the Toronto Tempo was created and will begin play in 2026 at the Coca-Cola Coliseum.

=== Cricket ===
The Caribbean Premier League professional Twenty20 cricket league has discussed its desire to place a franchise in Toronto.

The Global T20 Canada is a 20-over cricket tournament played in Canada. The first season of the tournament started in June 2018, with six teams competing, including the Toronto Nationals. The Maple Leaf Cricket Club in King City, Ontario hosted all matches for the first season of the competition. From the second season in 2019, the tournament was relocated to the TD Cricket Arena at the Sports Complex in Brampton, Ontario. After playing four seasons (2018, 2019, 2023, 2024), the tournament was suspended after Cricket Canada terminated their contract with Bombay Sports Limited in December 2024 for breach of contract. In April 2025 Cricket Canada awarded a new licensing deal to the National Cricket League (NCL) Canada to operate the GT20 Canada tournament going forward, and in September 2026 it was announced that the 2026 tournament would be hosted in Saint Vincent and the Grenadines, before returning to Canada the following year. The Toronto-based team was renamed the Toronto Kings.

On February 14, 2025, Cricket Canada, in partnership with British-based Star 333 Sports Inc., announced the launch of the new Canada Super60 cricket league, a 10-over tournament to debut in October 2025 at BC Place in Vancouver. The Toronto Sixers will be one of six teams competing in the tournament.

In 2025 it was reported that Toronto was being considered as an expansion location for a new Major League Cricket team to be launched by 2027.

=== Curling ===
Outside of 2014 & 2021, Toronto has hosted the Players' Championship bonspiels, the final curling event of the Grand Slam of Curling tour, since 2013 at the Mattamy Athletic Centre.

=== Golf ===
There are several golf courses in Toronto. Five of these golf courses are maintained by the municipal government of Toronto, including Dentonia Park Golf Course, Don Valley Golf Course, Humber Valley Golf Course, Scarlett Woods Golf Course, and Tam O’Shanter Golf Course. In addition to publicly operated golf courses, several private golf and country clubs also maintain golf courses in the city, including the Cedar Brae Golf Club, the Centennial Park Golf Club, the Donalda Club, the Lambton Golf and Country Club, the Markland Wood Golf Club, the Rosedale Golf Club, the Royal Woodbine Golf Club, the Scarboro Golf and Country Club, and the Toronto Hunt Club.

Several private golf clubs whose members are based in Toronto and that once operated a golf course within the city limits include the Ladies' Golf Club of Toronto and the Toronto Golf Club, although the former club later moved its course to Markham, Ontario while Toronto Golf Club moved to Mississauga. In addition to these golf clubs, several other golf courses operate adjacent to the City of Toronto.

Several golf courses in Toronto managed by private golf clubs have hosted professional golf tournaments in years past. This includes the Canadian Open, the Canadian PGA Championship, the Canadian Women's Open, the Labatt Open, and the Ontario Open. St. George's Golf and Country Club has hosted six Canadian Opens tournaments, the most out of any golf course in the city. The last golf course in the city to host a tournament was Oakdale Golf & Country Club in 2023.

=== Horse racing ===
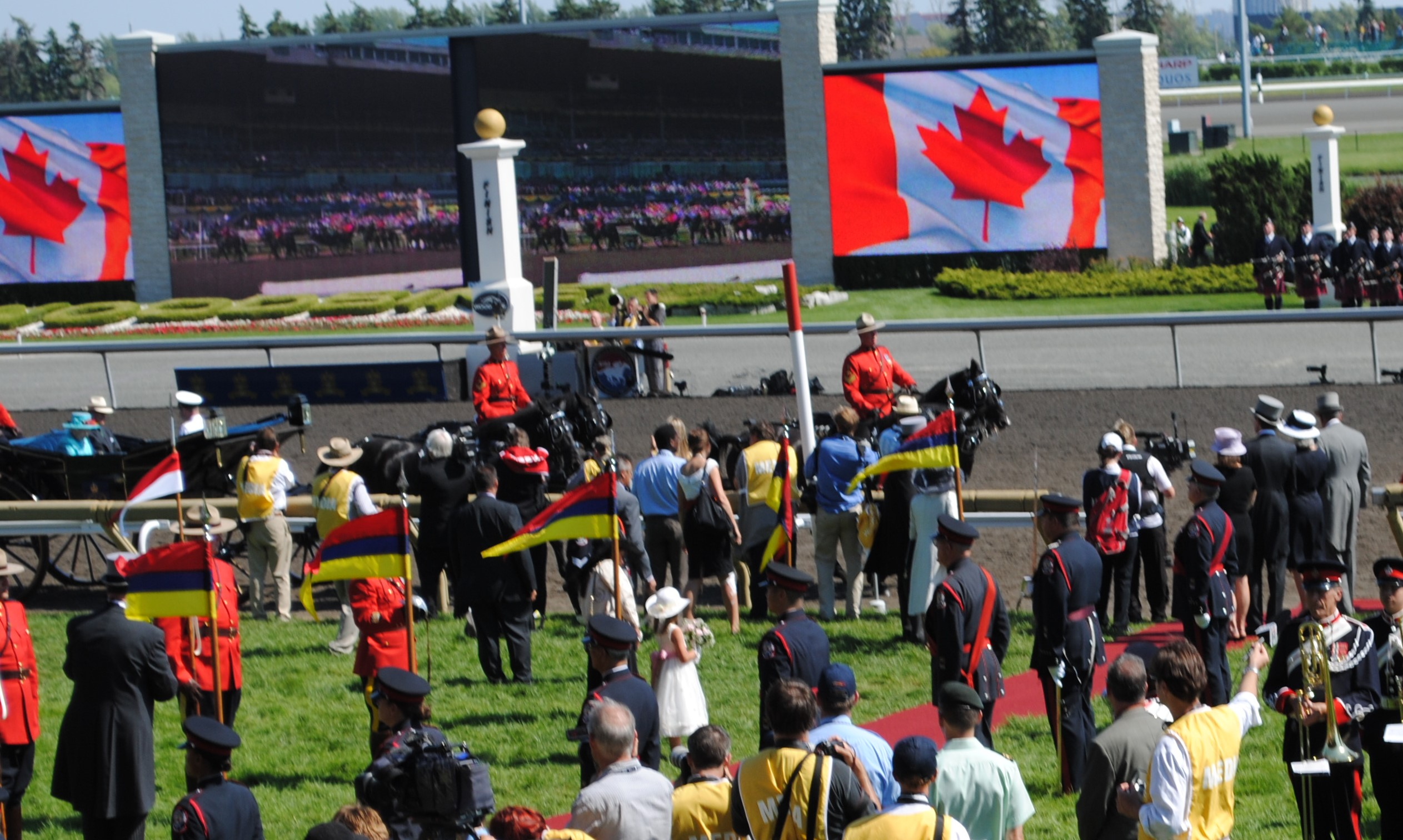
The 2010 Queen's Plate at Woodbine Racetrack was attended by its patron, Queen Elizabeth II.

Horse racing meets are held at Woodbine Racetrack in the northwestern suburb of Rexdale in Toronto. Woodbine is the only horse racing track in North America which stages, or is capable of staging, thoroughbred and standardbred racing programs on the same day. Woodbine hosts two of the three legs of the Canadian Triple Crown of Thoroughbred Racing—the opening Queen's Plate on its Polytrack synthetic dirt course, and the closing Breeders' Stakes on grass. In 1996 Woodbine became the first and only track outside the United States to host the Breeders' Cup World Championships. The Woodbine facility is also home to the Canadian Horse Racing Hall of Fame.

=== Ice hockey ===
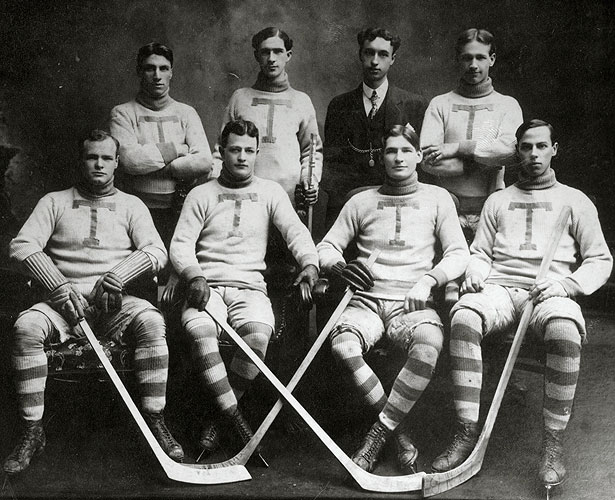
Team members of the 1906–07 Toronto Professional Hockey Club. Founded in 1906, the club was the first professional hockey team in Toronto.

The city is known for the Toronto Maple Leafs of the National Hockey League, a team with passionate support in the city, and the most financially successful sports franchise in the country. The team built Maple Leaf Gardens, a sporting venue which served as the home arena for the Maple Leafs, and was also used for cultural and other events. Since 1999, they have played in the Scotiabank Arena (initially referred to as the Air Canada Centre). The team's roots stretch back to the Toronto Blueshirts of the National Hockey Association, the predecessor to the NHL. The NHA was founded in 1909 without any teams from Toronto. In 1911, the Arena Gardens was being built and Ambrose O'Brien, who had operated four NHA franchises but decided to get out of the business, sold two of his franchises to Toronto-based groups. The Toronto Hockey Club purchased one, which would become known as the Blueshirts, and a second was sold to a group affiliated with the Tecumseh Lacrosse Club for $500 cash and promissory notes for $2,000 which would be called the Toronto Tecumsehs. They were scheduled to begin play in the 1911–12 season, but construction delays led to the two Toronto teams being dropped from the schedule and they instead began play in 1912–13. After a year of play, the Tecumsehs were sold and renamed the Toronto Ontarios. The following year the team was purchased by Eddie Livingstone, who renamed them the Toronto Shamrocks in January 1915. Later that year, Livingstone purchased the Blueshirts giving him ownership of two NHA teams, but after the Pacific Coast Hockey Association raids left him with only enough players for one team, he transferred Shamrocks players to the Blueshirts and only the Blueshirts competed in the 1915–16 NHA season. When Livingstone failed to sell the Shamrocks, the NHA seized the franchise, which was left dormant for the year before being reactivated in 1916–17, awarding it to a Canadian military team, the Toronto 228th Battalion. When the regiment was ordered overseas in February 1917, the team was forced to withdraw. That left the NHA with an odd number of teams, and as a result, the team owners, who wanted Livingstone out of the league, decided to suspend operations of the Blueshirts for the remainder of the season. Following the end of the season, Toronto was reinstated, with the condition that the club was to be sold within 60 days. However, Livingstone obtained a court order to prevent the sale. Before the start of the 1917–18 season, the NHA owners announced that the league would not operate in the 1917–18 season. About two weeks later, all of the owners except Livingstone announced that they were creating a new league, the National Hockey League. Livingstone was not invited to participate in the new league. However, the other teams wished to continue a team in Toronto, and also needed a fourth team to balance the schedule. Accordingly, Livingstone's landlord, the Toronto Arena Company, was given a temporary franchise in the NHL and leased Livingstone's Torontos players for the inaugural 1917–18 NHL season. Although the team had no official name, it was made up mostly of former Blue Shirts and as a result, the newspapers still called the team the Blue Shirts or the Torontos, as they always had. The Arena Company had originally promised to return the Toronto players to Livingstone if no transfer could be arranged. Instead, before the 1918–19 season, it formed a new club, which was known as the Toronto Arenas. This new franchise was separated from the Arena Company. The dispute with Livingstone forced the Arena Company into bankruptcy. The Arenas were sold to a group headed by Charles Querrie for $5000, who renamed them the Toronto St. Patricks. In 1927, with the team in trouble financially due to Querrie having lost a lawsuit to former Livingstone, Querrie put the St. Pats up for sale and agreed in principle to sell them for $200,000 to a group that would move the team to Philadelphia. However, Conn Smythe persuaded Querrie that civic pride was more important than money and put together a syndicate that bought the St. Pats. Smythe himself invested $10,000 of his own money and his group contributed $75,000 up front and a further $75,000 due 30 days later, with minority partner Jack Bickell retaining his $40,000 share in the team. The deal was finalized on Valentine's Day, and the new owners quickly renamed the team the Toronto Maple Leafs.

When the World Hockey Association, a rival league to the NHL, awarded Doug Michel an Ontario-based franchise in 1971 for $25,000 to play in the WHA's inaugural 1972–73 season, Toronto was one of several cities under consideration as home for the team. Harold Ballard, owner of the Maple Leafs and Maple Leaf Gardens, offered to rent the arena to the team, but Michel found the rent excessive. He then tried to base the team in Hamilton, but the city did not have an appropriate venue. Michel settled on Ottawa and the team became the Ottawa Nationals. However, after a season at the Ottawa Civic Centre, the team decided to relocate and played their home playoff games at Maple Leaf Gardens. During this time, the team was referred to as the Ontario Nationals. The team moved to Toronto permanently for the following season after being sold to John F. Bassett, son of former Leafs part-owner John W. H. Bassett. Future Leafs owner Steve Stavro was a minority shareholder. They were renamed the Toronto Toros in June 1973. In their inaugural season they played out of Varsity Arena, but played the next two seasons out of Maple Leaf Gardens. In the middle of the 1976 WHA playoffs Bassett announced that the team would relocate, citing average losses of nearly $1.5 million a year due to having only 3,600 season ticket holders for a venue that charged $15,000 rent per game. The team moved to Birmingham, Alabama as the Birmingham Bulls.

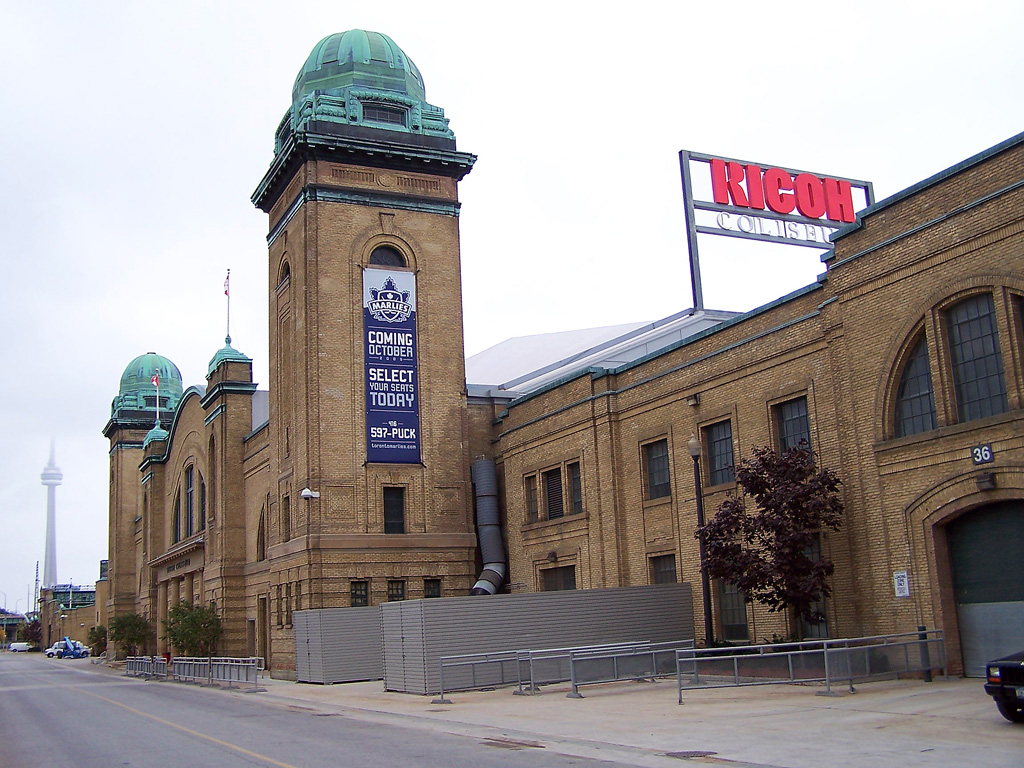
Originally built in 1920, Coca-Cola Coliseum was renovated in 2003 to accommodate the Toronto Marlies, the AHL affiliate of the Maple Leafs.

In the early 1980s, Ballard and the owner of the Edmonton Oilers discussed to possibility of the franchise swapping home cities with the Maple Leafs, with Ballard receiving $50 million to compensate him for relocating to the smaller city, but the deal fell through.

There have been numerous attempts to establish a second NHL team in the Greater Toronto Area or nearby Hamilton. The latter briefly had the Hamilton Tigers in the NHL from 1920, when local interests purchased and relocated the Quebec Bulldogs, until 1925 when they folded.

In 2003, the Toronto Roadrunners of the American Hockey League played their inaugural season out of a renovated Ricoh Coliseum in Exhibition Place. They served as a farm club for the NHL's Edmonton Oilers. After a season of bad attendance, the team relocated to Edmonton, Alberta. However, with the Ricoh Coliseum vacated, a new tenant for the facility was found with the Maple Leafs relocating their AHL farm team, the St. John's Maple Leafs, from St. John's, Newfoundland and Labrador to Toronto as the Toronto Marlies in 2005.

Toronto has also hosted various international hockey tournaments: hosting parts of the 1972 and 1974 Summit Series; parts of the 1976 and 1991 Canada Cups; parts of the 2004 World Cup of Hockey and all of the 2016 edition; and parts of the 2015 and 2017 World Junior Ice Hockey Championships.

Participation in minor hockey is very popular. The Greater Toronto Area is home to the Greater Toronto Hockey League (GTHL), the largest minor hockey league in the world. In addition to the GTHL, a number of other minor hockey leagues that are unsanctioned by the Ontario Hockey Federation also operate in Greater Toronto.

The Greater Toronto Area has also been home to several women's hockey team including the professional Canadian Women's Hockey League's (CWHL) Markham Thunder and Toronto Furies. However, the league ceased operations in 2019. In 2020, the National Women's Hockey League (NWHL), later rebranded as the Premier Hockey Federation (PHF) announced expansion to Toronto with the Toronto Six taking the ice for the 2020–21 season. The Six would ultimately win the 2023 Isobel Cup as the PHF's champions. It would ultimately become the PHF's final championship team as the league was dissolved to make way for a new Professional Women's Hockey League consisting of the former PHF consolidating with the Professional Women's Hockey Players Association later that summer with Toronto Sceptres being granted one of the league's six charter teams for their inaugural season in 2024.

On July 10, 2020, Toronto was named one of two cities appointed as a hub city (alongside Edmonton, Alberta) for the NHL Return to Play Plan to facilitate the delayed start of the 2020 Stanley Cup playoffs due to the COVID-19 pandemic. All matches in Toronto were played in Scotiabank Arena beginning August 1, 2020. The plan featured a Stanley Cup Qualifiers round for the 2020 Stanley Cup playoffs as well as its first 2 rounds. Of the 24 participating teams, Toronto hosted 12 Eastern Conference teams to their city in the early rounds, while Edmonton hosted 12 Western Conference teams in the early rounds, both Conference Finals, and the Stanley Cup Final.

=== Inline hockey ===
The Toronto Torpedoes played in the Major League Roller Hockey in 1998 at Carnegie Centennial Centre.

The Toronto Planets played in the inaugural season of Roller Hockey International in 1993 at Varsity Arena, but folded at the conclusion of the season.

In September 2025 the Professional Inline Hockey Association announced that the Toronto 6ixers had joined the league as a new team.

=== Gridiron football ===
==== Canadian football ====
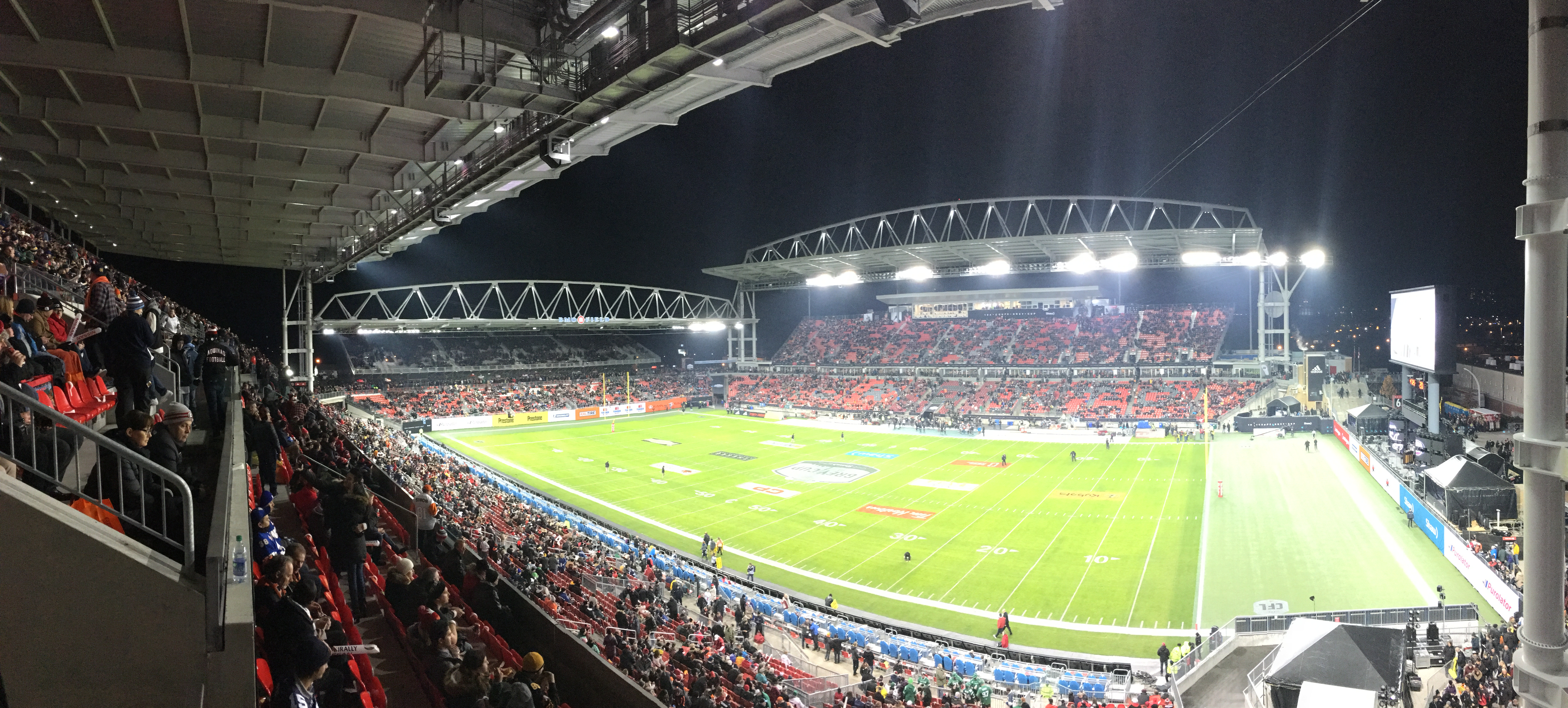
BMO Field during the 104th Grey Cup. BMO Field is the present home stadium of the Toronto Argonauts.

Toronto is home to the oldest professional football team in North America, the Toronto Argonauts, who have won the Grey Cup championship a record 18 times, most recently in 2022. Toronto has also played host to the Grey Cup Championship 48 times, more than any other city and most recently the 104th Grey Cup in 2016. The Argos were founded in 1873 by the Argonaut Rowing Club and is referred to colloquially as the Boatmen in honour of that heritage. The team is also known as the double blue because of the franchise colours (Oxford blue and Cambridge blue); the colour blue has become emblematic of the city and most of its sports franchises. The Argos also draw the highest per-game attendance of any sports team in Toronto and draw the second highest per-game TV ratings nationally of any Toronto-based sports team (after the Maple Leafs hockey club). In the early 1970s, Maple Leaf Gardens Limited announced plans to apply for a second Canadian Football League team to be based in Toronto which would play at Varsity Stadium, but the proposal never went anywhere. During his tenure as owner of the Hamilton Tiger-Cats, Ballard repeatedly threatened to move the franchise to Varsity Stadium, but the move was vetoed by the Argos. The GTA Grizzlies is another semi-professional junior team of the Canadian Junior Football League; playing their home games at Centennial Park Stadium.

Toronto has also hosted the Vanier Cup Championship 41 times, the most out of any host city, serving as its exclusive host from its inception in 1965 until 2003. In 2004, Canadian Interuniversity Sport began accepting bids from other cities to host the event. Since then, Toronto has won 2 additional bids to host Vanier Cup Championships in 2007 and 2012 to coincide with both the 95th and 100th Grey Cups being played during the same weekend in the city.

==== American football ====
Toronto also has a long history with American football. The first professional U.S. football team to play a home game in Toronto was the Los Angeles Wildcats of the American Football League of 1926, the first major competitor to the National Football League for the dominance of professional football. While the Wildcats nominally represented Los Angeles, California, frequent travel to the west coast still posed a major obstacle so the team was instead a traveling team based in Illinois and played most of its games in the home stadiums of its opponents, with the exception of the Toronto game. The Wildcats lost the regular season game to the New York Yankees (which would join the National Football League (NFL) the following year) 28–0 in front of 10,000 fans at Maple Leaf Stadium on November 8, 1926. The NFL has had a presence in Toronto since 1959 when the Argonauts hosted three NFL teams in a three-season span. The nearby Hamilton Tiger-Cats also hosted a game against the Buffalo Bills, then an American Football League team. Several decades later, the American Bowl and later the Bills Toronto Series brought both preseason and regular season games to the Rogers Centre.

There have been several failed attempts to establish a professional American football franchise in Toronto in the past. A Toronto group submitted a bid for an American Football League expansion team for the city in 1960, the expansion fee set at $125,000, with plans to play in the league's second season in the following year. Toronto interests continued pursuing an AFL team for several years, with the league naming the city as a potential expansion market in 1965. In 1964 a Toronto group applied for a United Football League franchise, but ultimately withdrew their bid for a team. Following the season, a Toronto group attempted to purchase the Canton Bulldogs of the UFL to relocate them to Toronto. When the Continental Football League was established for the 1965 season with former UFL teams, the Quebec Rifles of the UFL were admitted and transferred to Toronto to become the Toronto Rifles due to a lack of a suitable facility in Montreal. The Rifles competed in the Continental League from 1965 to 1967, but the owners pulled out in the middle of their final season after having lost a reported $400,000 in their final full season. The league took over the club and planned to have it play all of its games on the road, but several weeks later the team folded. The Universal Football League announced in 1973 that it would begin play the following year with Toronto was listed as one of ten teams, but the league never launched.

During John Bassett's ownership of the Argonauts from the late 1950s to early 1970s, he entertained various machinations for bringing American football to Toronto, including moving the Argos to the NFL or bringing an NFL team to the city alongside the Argos. Other CFL team owners were steadfastly against Bassett's moves and almost rescinded his franchise in 1974. His son John F. Bassett obtained a World Football League franchise for the city in the league's inaugural season of 1974, which he named the Toronto Northmen, but in response the Canadian government proposed the Canadian Football Act, a bill that would have banned US football leagues from playing in Canada to protect the CFL from competition. The bill forced Bassett to move the club to Memphis where they became the Memphis Southmen. When the legislation died without being approved before the 1974 Canadian federal election, Bassett again attempted to put a WFL team in Toronto for the 1975 season. There were plans to establish a United States Football League franchise in Toronto in 1983 being pushed by John F. Bassett, but again the Canadian government warned against it and the idea was dropped.

The International Football Federation announced in 1999 that it planned to begin play the following year with Toronto listed as one of 13 teams, but the league never launched. The XFL considered expanding to Toronto for its 2002 season, but ultimately folded after its inaugural season in 2001. There have been efforts to bring an NFL team to Toronto for more than 40 years. In 2014, it was widely reported that Toronto interests, including Larry Tanenbaum, part owner of Maple Leaf Sports & Entertainment (MLSE), and Edward Rogers III, Deputy Chairman of Rogers Communication, were attempting to acquire an NFL franchise in hopes of moving it to Toronto.

There were numerous attempts to bring the Arena Football League to Maple Leaf Gardens in the 1990s. The city was considered by the league for a 1996 and 1997 expansion club, with John Bitove, owner of the Toronto Raptors, one of several groups interested in owning the team. MLSE held negotiations with the Arena League on acquiring a $4–7 million expansion franchise for 1999 to coincide with the opening of their new building the ACC. Several other groups also considered putting a club in the ACC following its opening. In 2000, the New England Sea Wolves were purchased by a group led by Rogers Communication and relocated from Hartford, Connecticut, becoming the Toronto Phantoms the following year. However, the team lasted only two seasons before folding when the Arena League switched its regular season window from the summer to the spring.

Toronto also hosted a series of NCAA football bowl games called the International Bowl between 2007 and 2010.

Toronto was granted an expansion team in the women's Lingerie Football League (now the Legends Football League), the Toronto Triumph. The team played their games at the Ricoh Coliseum for one season in 2011–12. The league is legitimate indoor football, which at the time was played by women in lingerie and football pads, though players now wear more standard athletic apparel.

=== Lacrosse ===
The city previously had several professional box lacrosse teams. A team named the Toronto Maple Leafs competed in the first season of the professional International Lacrosse League in 1931 at the Arena Gardens. Following the season, a new franchise was awarded to Conn Smythe on behalf of Maple Leaf Gardens Ltd. (MLGL), which was also named the Toronto Maple Leafs, with the previous season's Maple Leafs being renamed the Tecumsehs. Both teams played at the newly opened Maple Leaf Gardens. Smythe pulled out following the season due to financial losses, and the league didn't play the following year. Toronto also had a team in the American Box Lacrosse League in 1932.

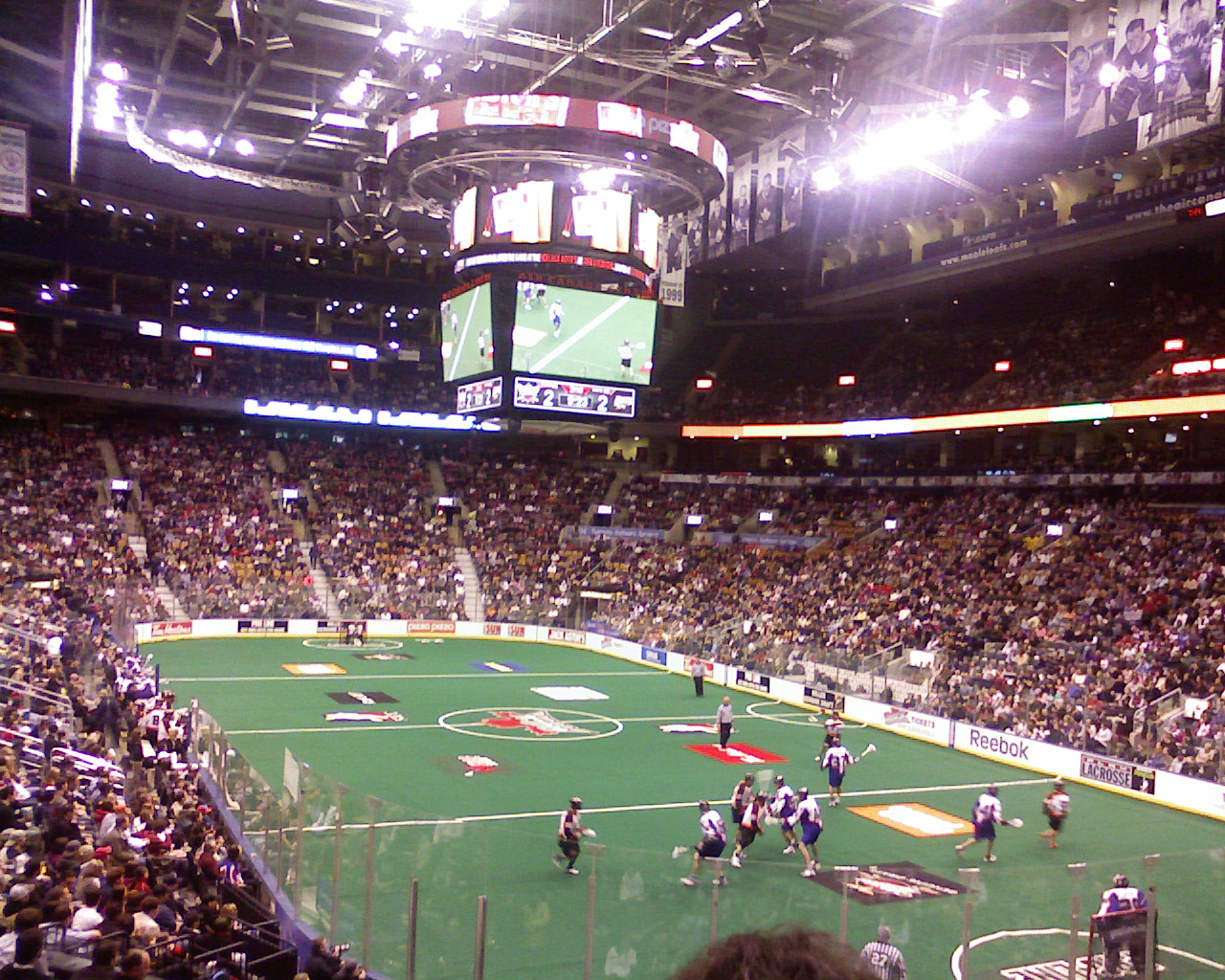
Inside the Air Canada Centre, the Toronto Rock play against the Buffalo Bandits.

The Toronto Maple Leafs competed in the inaugural season of the National Lacrosse Association in 1968 at the Gardens. Stafford Smythe and Harold Ballard, part owners of the NHL Maple Leafs, were two of the five founding partners of the club, but financial difficulties forced MLGL to take over ownership midway through the season. The NLA suspended operations prior to the following season. However, the eastern division of the NLA reconstituted itself as the Eastern Professional Lacrosse Association, in which the Maple Leafs competed in 1969. By 1970 the pro league had disbanded.

The Toronto Shooting Stars joined the professional National Lacrosse League (unrelated to the modern NLL) for its inaugural season in 1972. When a new professional league launched as the National Lacrosse League (again unrelated to today's NLL) in 1974, the Toronto Tomahawks were included as a charter franchise. The Shooting Stars continued as an amateur team in the Ontario Lacrosse Association, but folded following the 1974 season. The Tomahawks were sold following the 1974 season, and received league approval to move the team to Nassau Veterans Memorial Coliseum in Long Island, New York. However, ultimately it was decided to relocate the team to Boston to become the Boston Bolts for the start of the 1975 NLL season, with the Rochester Griffins becoming the Long Island Tomahawks.

The Toronto Rock, which operate in the National Lacrosse League, were founded in 1998 as the Ontario Raiders in Hamilton. The following year, a group bought the team and relocated it to Toronto where it was rebranded as the Toronto Rock. The Rock proceeded to finish first every year from 1999 to 2005, winning the league championship in five of those seven seasons. The team played their home games at Maple Leaf Gardens from 1999 to 2000, and at Scotiabank Arena from 2001 to 2020. In 2021, the Rock announced that they were relocating back to Hamilton, but would continue to keep the "Toronto Rock" name to represent the GTHA.

In 2009, the Toronto Nationals of Major League Lacrosse was established, with much of the roster of the Rochester Rattlers, which would be suspended, being transferred to the new Nationals' team. However, the name, colours, and history stayed behind in Rochester to potentially be used by a future MLL team. In their inaugural year in Toronto, the Nationals went on to win the Steinfeld Cup. In 2011 the team relocated to Hamilton, Ontario, and played their games at Ron Joyce Stadium. After the 2013 season the team announced they would not field a team the following season. The Premier Lacrosse League played a week of their inaugural 2019 season at Tim Hortons Field in Hamilton.

=== Rugby league ===
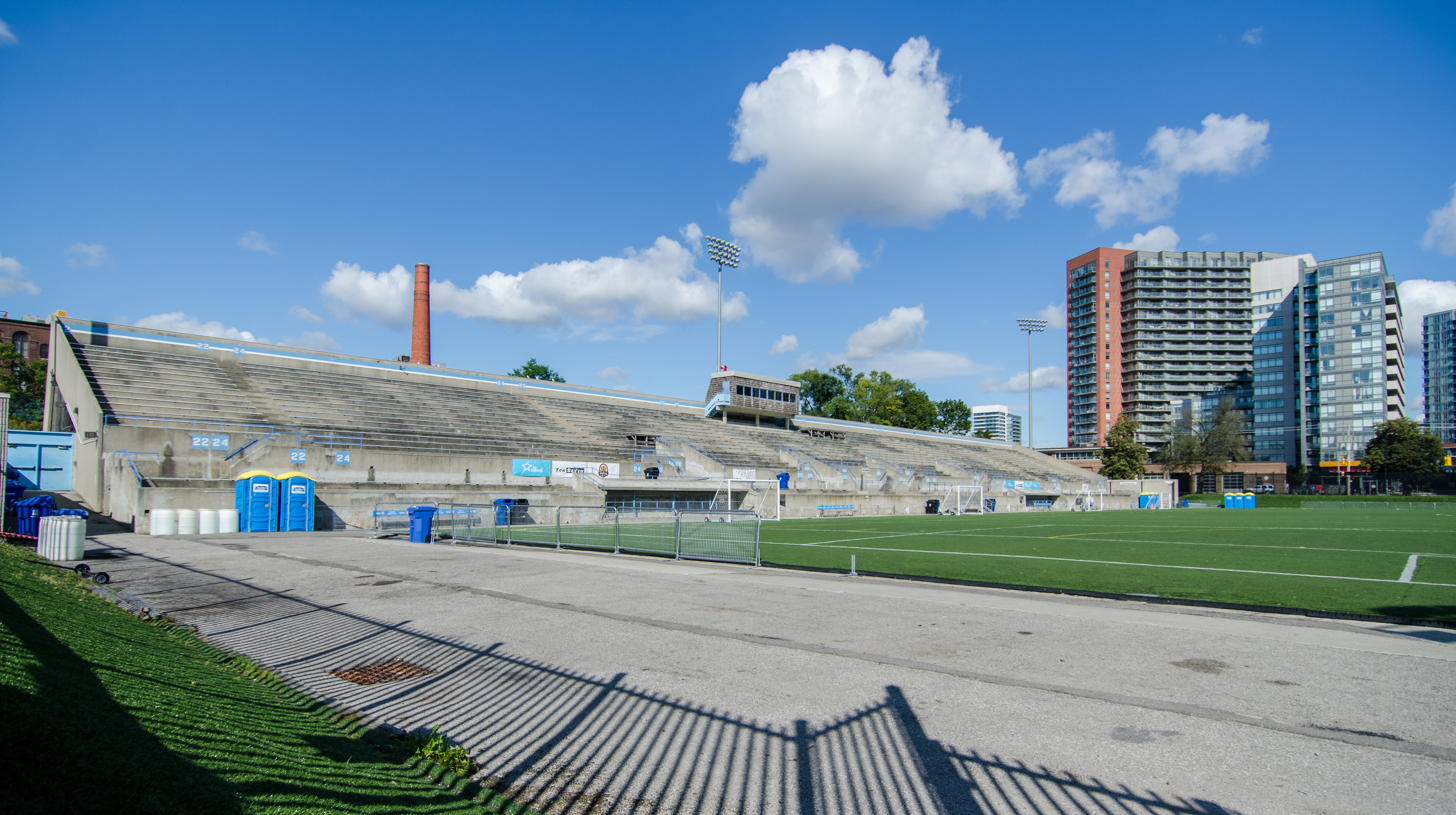
Lamport Stadium is the home stadium for the Canadian national rugby league team and the Toronto Wolfpack rugby league club

In 2014, Toronto investors submitted an application for a professional rugby league franchise in the British/French League 1, the third-tier of the Rugby Football League (RFL) system. It was announced in 2016 that the Toronto Wolfpack would join the RFL's third division League One from April 2017, becoming the not the first professional transatlantic sports team to be based in Toronto in addition to being the first for the RFL system. The team plays in Toronto's 9,600 seat Lamport Stadium, with the goal of earning promotion to the top-tier Super League. The club won the League 1 championship in its inaugural season, thereby earning promotion to the second division Championship for the 2018 season.

In 2018, the Wolfpack reached the Qualifiers, an end of season round robin tournament for the four top teams from the RFL Championship, and the bottom four teams from Super League. Finishing fourth qualified Wolfpack for the Million Pound Game, a final eliminator for the last place in Super League in 2019. However, they were defeated 6–4 by London Broncos, and thus rejoined the RFL Championship for the 2019 season. That season saw a change in the promotion system, with the top five Championship teams entering a playoff whose winner received automatic promotion to Super League. The Wolfpack finished atop the Championship regular-season table, and easily won both of their playoff matches, securing their promotion to Super League with a 24–6 win over Featherstone Rovers.

In July 2020, Toronto Wolfpack withdrew from the 2020 Super League due to financial difficulties and new logistics needed for international travel caused by the COVID-19 pandemic. A subsequent bid for readmission was rejected on November 2, 2020, and resulted in the team's removal from the league & their ensuing announcement that they would not operate in 2021. On March 31, 2021, it was announced that a private investor group had purchased the Wolfpack and that they would be resuming play in the newly formed North American Rugby League.

The amateur Ontario Rugby league competition has fluctuated between 2 and 4 teams since it began in 2010.

The Canada national rugby league team, nicknamed the Wolverines, are also based at Lamport Stadium.

=== Rugby union ===
Amateur rugby is organized under the Toronto Rugby Union, a branch of Rugby Ontario. There are over 20 clubs in the city and surrounding area. There a 4 divisions for Toronto teams as well as the top teams playing in the province-wide Marshall Premiership and McCormick Cup competitions. Rugby has been played in Toronto since the 1870s, although at times sporadically. The oldest of the current clubs date back to the 1940s and '50s, starting with the Wanderers in 1949.

The semi-pro rugby union team the Toronto Rebellion (formerly the Renegades and Xtreme) played in the Rugby Canada Super League from 1999 to 2007 and the Rugby Canada National Junior Championship in 2009. The team hosted games at Markham, Ontario's Fletcher's Fields in the north of the Greater Toronto Area. The team was replaced by the Ontario Blues of the Canadian Rugby Championship in 2009, who play their games at various locations across the province including Fletcher's Fields. In 2016, the United States-based PRO Rugby league stated that it was considering expanding to Toronto, though the plans fell through and the league folded before its second season. Pro14, a European-based league, in 2017 was reportedly considering placing an expansion franchise in Toronto.

In 2017, the Ontario Arrows were formed as a semi-professional version of the Ontario Blues. They began playing a series of exhibition games against MLR, American amateur clubs, and other opposition, to prepare for applying to join Major League Rugby. In November 2018 their entry was announced, including a re-brand to the Toronto Arrows. They began MLR play in January 2019 as an expansion team along with Rugby United New York. The Arrows have played at York University's Alumni Field and downtown at Lamport Stadium, but moved their games to York Lions Stadium for the 2022 season. On November 27, 2023, it was announced that the Arrows would not compete in the 2024 MLR season.

=== Running ===
The city is home to two marathons: the Toronto Marathon (held annually in May from Mel Lastman Square, in the north end of Toronto to Ontario Place) and the Toronto Waterfront Marathon (held annually in October throughout downtown Toronto). Toronto also hosts the annual Sporting Life 10K, a charitable fundraising 10K run held in May from Yonge & Davisville to Lake Shore Boulevard near Ontario Place, and the Under Armour Toronto 10K, a 10K run held in June along Toronto's waterfront.

=== Soccer ===
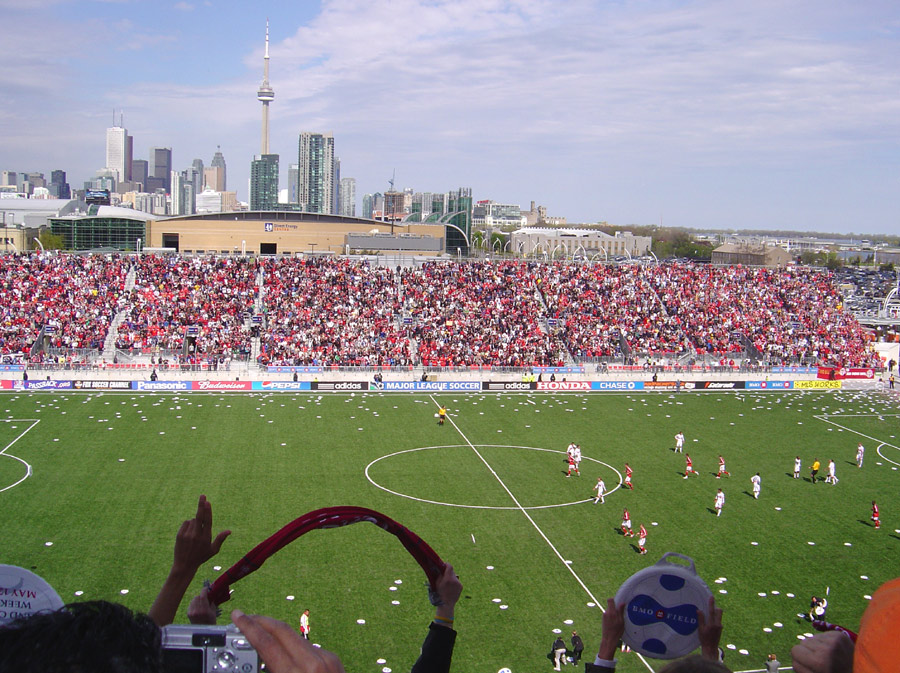
Crowd celebrating at BMO Field after Toronto FC score the club's first goal. BMO Field hosts the Toronto FC and the Toronto Argonauts.

The popularity of soccer reflects the city's demographics; Toronto is a multicultural city with a large immigrant population that has long-established roots with the game.

Toronto has had teams in a number of first division soccer leagues of the United States. The Toronto Greenbacks were members of the North American Soccer Football League for its two years of existence in 1946–47. In 1967, two rival leagues began play: the United Soccer Association (USA) and National Professional Soccer League (NPSL). Both leagues had Toronto-based clubs with Toronto City (owned by future owner of Maple Leaf Sports & Entertainment Steve Stavro) joining the US and the Toronto Falcons in the NPSL and both playing their games at Varsity Stadium. Following the merger of the two leagues for the 1968 season only the Falcons survived, with Stavro selling his team back to the league for $160,000. However, the Falcons only played a single year in the newly founded North American Soccer League (NASL) with losses reported to be up to $500,000 before folding. The following year, Toronto City was invited to join the NASL. Subsequently, the Toronto Metros joined the NASL in 1971, and though they were renamed the Toronto Metros-Croatia in 1975 following the purchase of 50 per cent of the club for $250,000 by the Toronto Croatia of the National Soccer League, and again in 1979 to the Toronto Blizzard following the acquisition of 85% of the team by Global Television Network for $2.6 million, the team played until the NASL folded in 1984.

Varsity Stadium on the campus of the University of Toronto, hosted some of the matches of the Olympic football tournament of the 1976 Summer Olympics in Montreal.

In 1994, then part owner of SkyDome, Labatt, considered purchasing a team in Major League Soccer (MLS), the new top US league, to play at the stadium. In 2004, then Toronto Argonauts owners Howard Sokolowski and David Cynamon considered bringing a MLS team to the city in connection with negotiations on the construction of a new stadium to jointly house the Argos and soccer, but when BMO Field was ultimately built the Argos were excluded for the deal. In 2007, Maple Leaf Sports & Entertainment launched Toronto FC in MLS as its first international team.

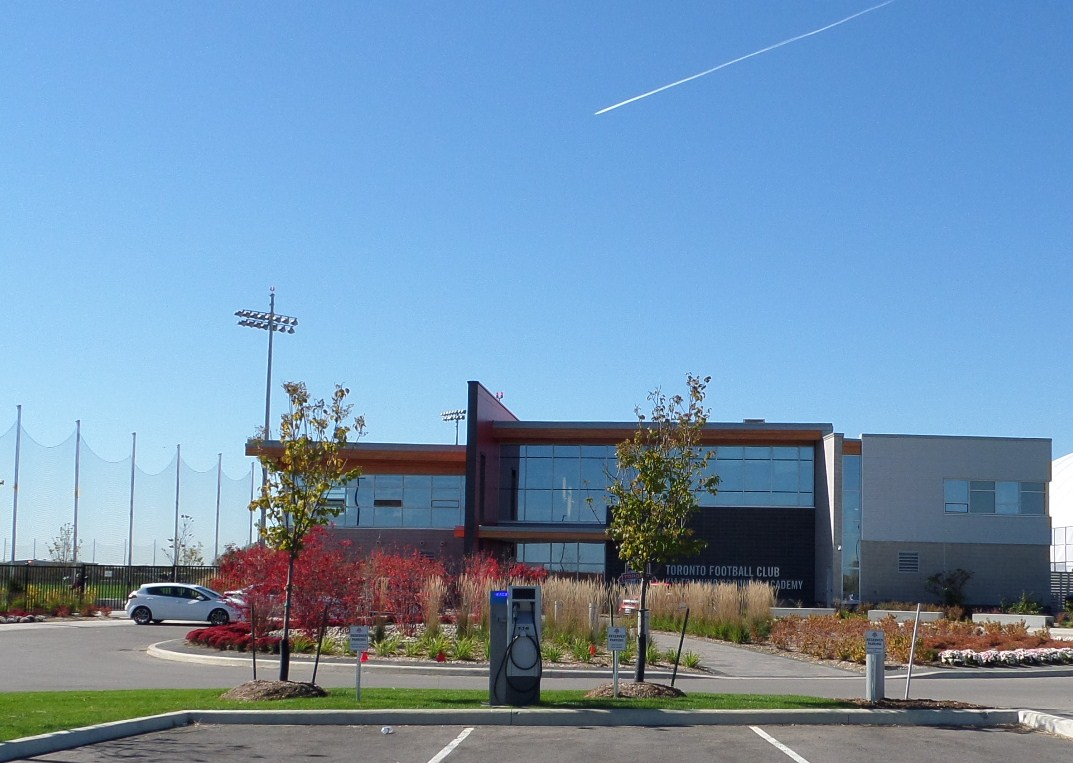
KIA Training Grounds is a practice facility used by the Toronto FC, and their youth academy, TFC Academy.

Toronto has also hosted professional indoor soccer teams. The Metros-Croatia fielded a team in NASL's indoor league from 1975 to 1976, as did the Blizzard in 1980–82. The Major Indoor Soccer League considered putting a team in Toronto in 1987. In 1988 the American Indoor Soccer Association (AISA) granted Toronto a franchise which was to play its games at Hamilton, Ontario's Copps Coliseum (now TD Coliseum), but the team never launched. The Toronto Shooting Stars competed in the National Professional Soccer League, as the AISA had renamed itself, during the 1996–97 season, but the ownership of the franchise collapsed just 3 games in, forcing the league to take control of the team's operations for the remainder of the season. After losses of nearly $1 million, the team suspended operations and never returned to play. An application was made for a new NPSL Toronto team in 1998. The NPSL returned to Toronto with the Toronto ThunderHawks for the 2000–01 season, playing at the Hershey Centre in Mississauga, Ontario. When the NPSL disbanded in the summer of 2001 and reorganized as the Major Indoor Soccer League, the ThunderHawks were admitted to the new league under the condition that they would suspend operations for the 2001–02 season to work on the business side of the franchise and return to active competition for the 2002–03 season. However, the team never returned from this temporary suspension of operations. In April 2017 the Major Arena Soccer League announced that it had granted Totonto an expansion franchise, which was later named the Mississauga MetroStars and begin play in 2018 at the Hershey Centre. Prior to the 2019–20 season the team rebranded as MetroStars Canada, and planned to play their 12 home games in six cities across Ontario (St. Catharines, Kingston, Oshawa, Windsor, Sarnia, and Brampton), but before playing a single game that season the team confirmed that they would not participate due to issues coordinating their home matches. In August 2024 the Canadian Crusaders joined the Major League Indoor Soccer, with the franchise being a relocation of former club Central Florida Crusaders of the National Indoor Soccer League which had merged with the MLIS earlier in the year. The team plays their games in Toronto at the Scarborough Soccer Centre.

Toronto has also been home to numerous minor pro soccer teams. The Toronto Nationals played in the Canadian Professional Soccer League in its only season in 1983. The Eastern Canada Professional Soccer League, which existed between 1961 and 1966, featured 3 Toronto based teams over those years: Toronto City (1961–1965), which later joined the United Soccer Association, Toronto Roma FC (1962–1964) / Inter-Roma (1965–1966), and Toronto Italia FC (1961–1964) / Italia Falcons (1965–66). The Toronto Blizzard played in the Canadian Soccer League from 1987 to 1992 and the American Professional Soccer League in 1993 before folding following the United States Soccer Federation's decision to reject the APSL's bid for sanctioning as a first division league in favour of a competing bid from the group that would found MLS. The Blizzard were replaced in the APSL by the Toronto Rockets in 1994, but they to folded prior to the following season. The A-League, as the APSL was then known, awarded Toronto another team to begin play in 1997. When the A-league and USISL Select League merged for the 1997 season, the Toronto expansion team, which was named the Toronto Lynx, debuted in the combined league, which carried on the A-League name. The Lynx would play in the A-League until 2004. When the league was renamed the USL First Division, they continued their membership. However, in 2007, with the arrival of TFC to the city, the Lynx dropped down to the fourth USL Premier Development League, where they competed until 2014.

Toronto hosted parts of the 2007 FIFA U-20 World Cup. Toronto also hosted the 2010 Major League Soccer championship match between FC Dallas and Colorado Rapids (Colorado defeated Dallas 2–1). It was the first time the MLS Cup took place outside of the United States.

Toronto would go on to host 2 more MLS Cups. On December 10, 2016, the MLS Cup was held at BMO Field where Toronto FC and Seattle Sounders FC played to a 0–0 draw, with the Sounders winning 5–4 on penalty kicks to claim the championship. On December 9, 2017, Toronto FC defeated the Sounders 2–0 in an MLS Cup rematch, and became the first MLS team to complete a domestic treble with their win by virtue of winning the Supporters' Shield with an MLS record 69 points and the Canadian Championship combined. They also became the first Canadian team to win the MLS Cup.

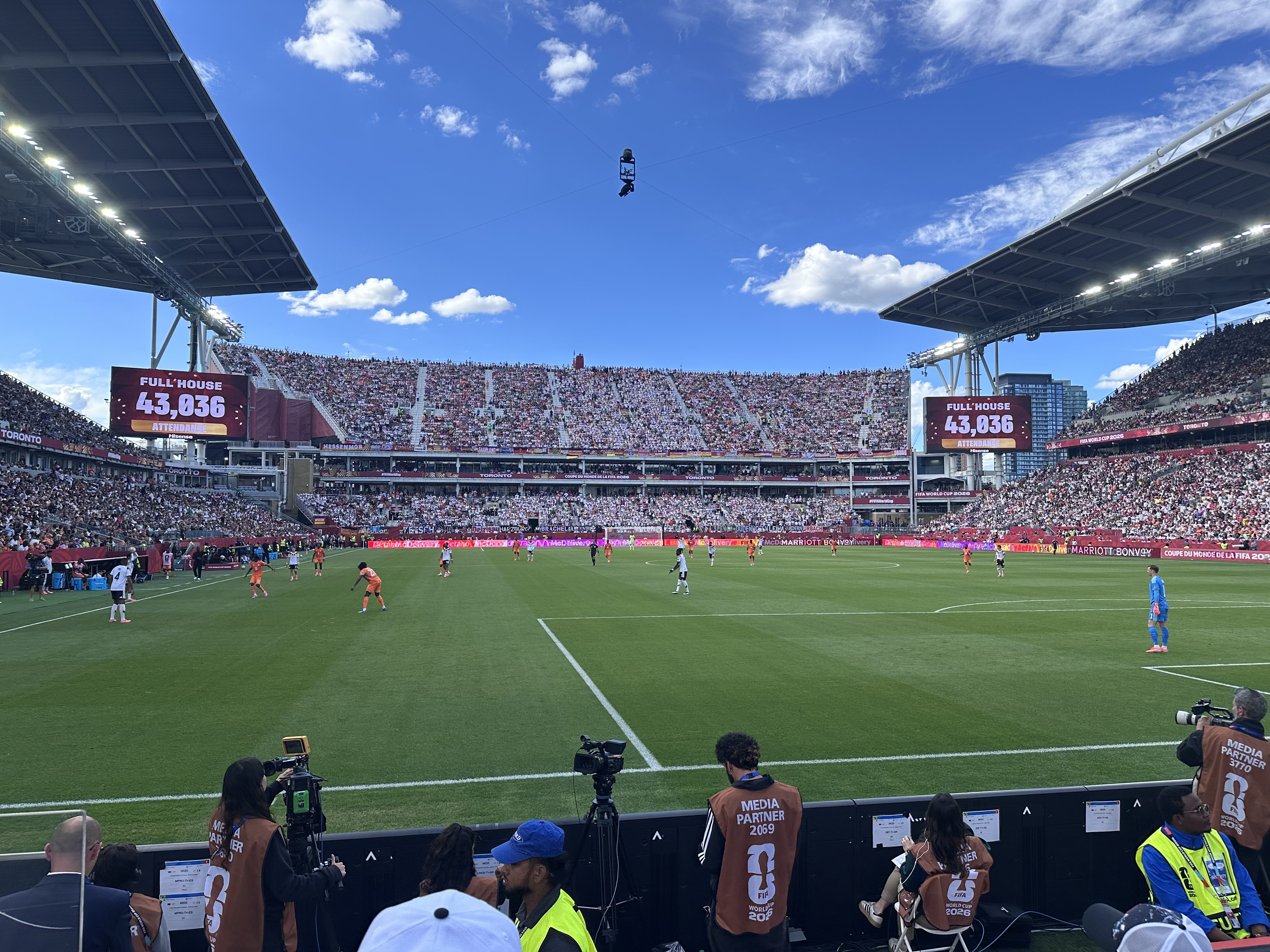
BMO Field during a match between Germany and Côte d'Ivoire at the 2026 FIFA World Cup.

On June 16, 2022, FIFA officially announced Toronto as one of two host cities in Canada for the 2026 FIFA World Cup to be held across the US, Mexico, & Canada. BMO Field was listed as a potential venue for the World Cup from as early as 2017 during the initial bidding stage. BMO Field underwent a temporary expansion and went on to host six matches during the 2026 FIFA World Cup.

Toronto's first women's professional soccer team, AFC Toronto of the Northern Super League, began play in 2025.

=== Tennis ===
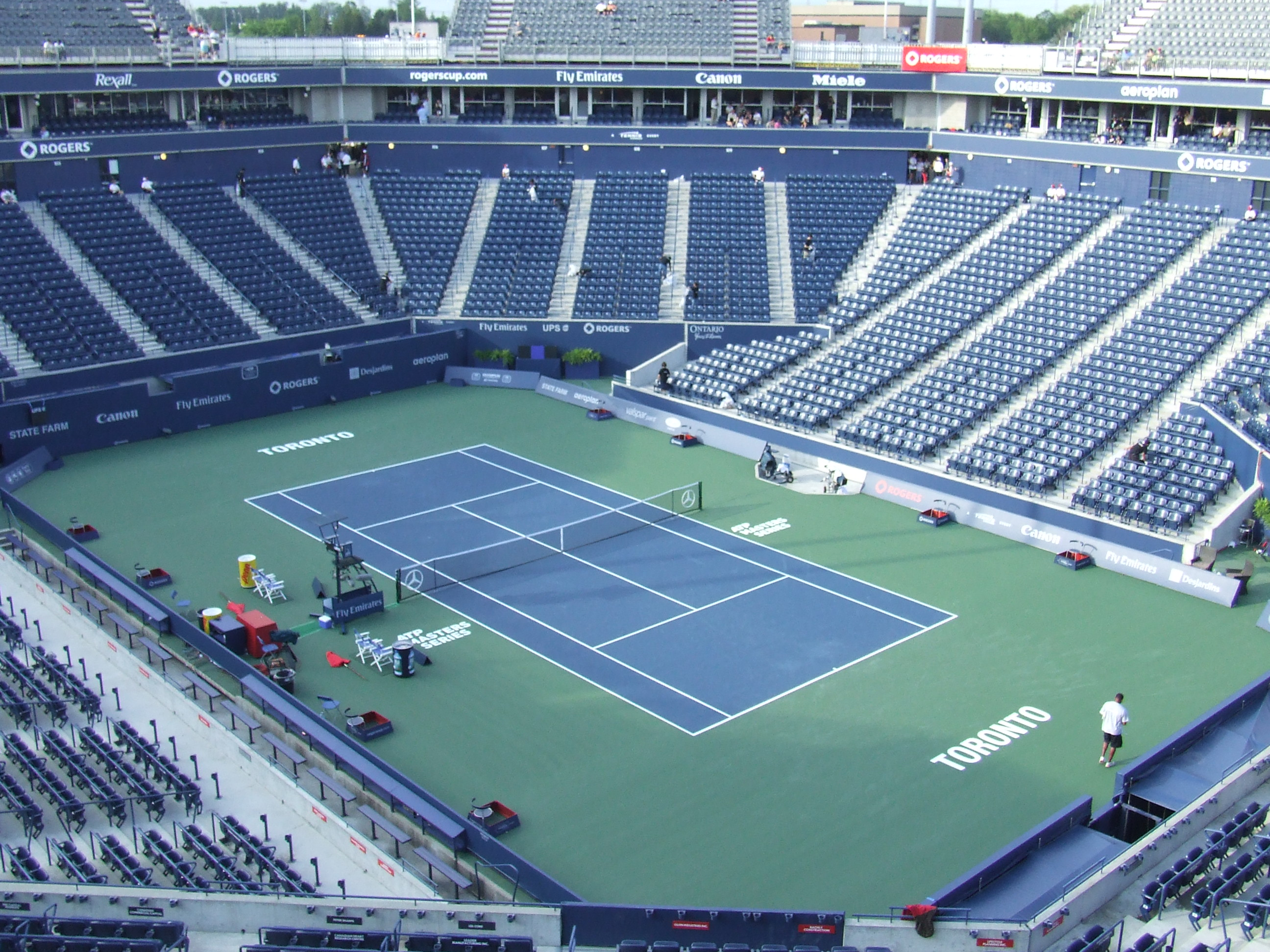
Sobeys Stadium is one of the two tennis stadiums that host the annual Canada Masters.

The National Bank Open, historically known as the Canadian Open, is an annual professional tennis tournament held at Sobeys Stadium at York University. The tournament began in 1881 and is the second oldest major tennis tournament in the world behind only Wimbledon. The men's competition is an ATP World Tour Masters 1000 event on the Association of Tennis Professionals (ATP) tour. The women's competition is a WTA 1000 tournament event on the Women's Tennis Association (WTA) tour. The events alternate from year-to-year between the cities of Montreal and Toronto. In odd-numbered years, the men's tournament is held in Montreal, while the women's tournament is held in Toronto, and vice versa in even-numbered years. The competition is played on hard courts.

From 1971 until 1990, Toronto hosted the Toronto Molson Light Challenge a second annual professional men's tennis tournament played on indoor carpet courts at Maple Leaf Gardens. The final tournament took place in February 1990 at the SkyDome and went by the tournament name Skydome World Tennis.

In 1974, the Toronto-Buffalo Royals of World Team Tennis played half their home matches at the CNE Coliseum & the other half at the Buffalo Memorial Auditorium. Under the ownership of John F. Bassett & John C. Eaton III, the team lasted only one season before selling the team to Bert Hoffman & Phyllis Morse with the intent of relocating them to Hartford, Connecticut. However, in February 1975, the team was contracted by the WTT, with the players distributed to other teams via a dispersal draft.

=== Ultimate ===
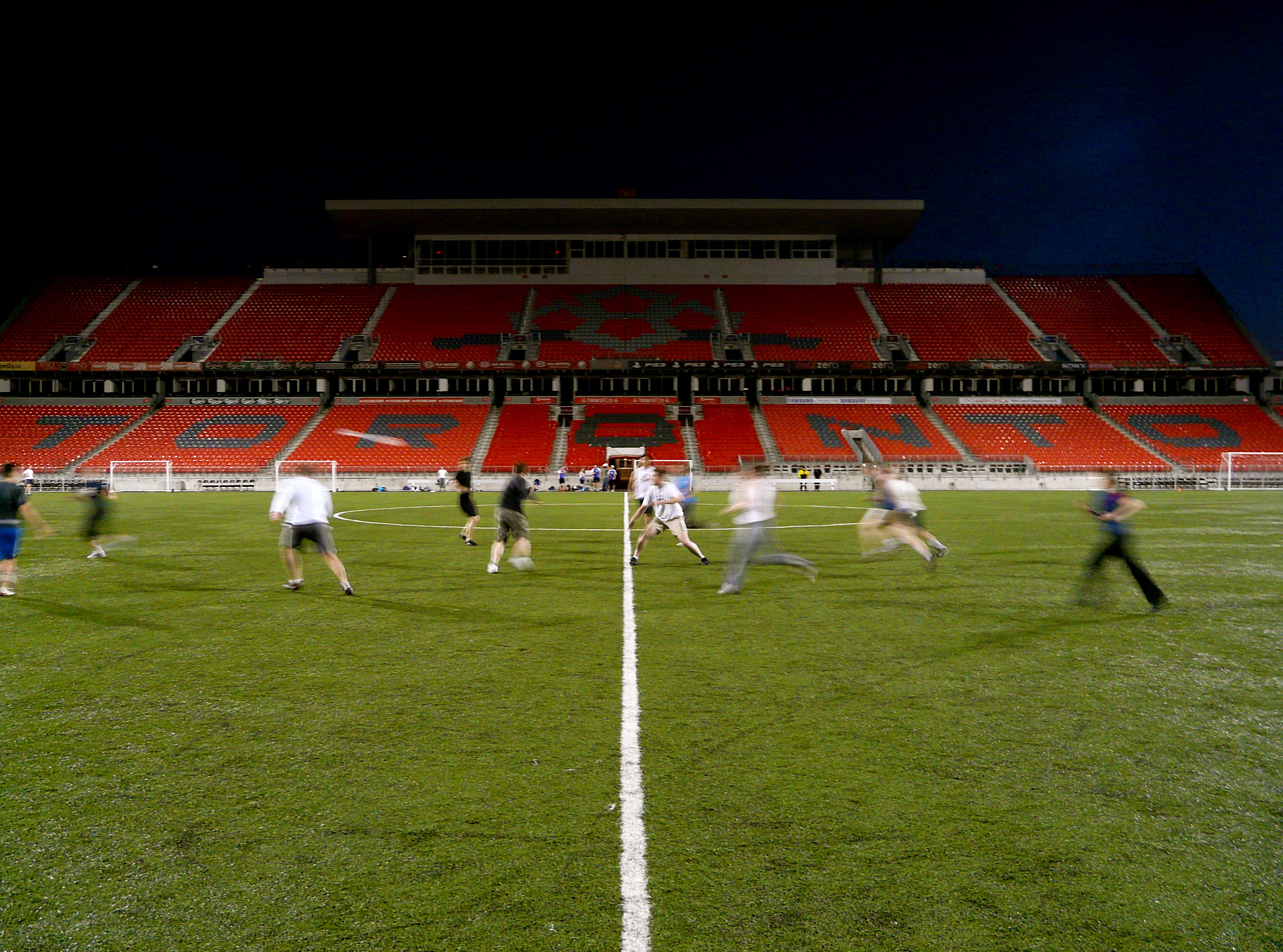
A game of ultimate being played at BMO Field, May 2009

Ultimate is a team sport played with a flying disc. The object of the game is to score points by passing the disc to members of your own team, on a rectangular field approximately the size of a soccer field, until you have successfully completed a pass to a team member in the opposing team's end zone. In the 1970s, Ken Westerfield introduced disc sports including ultimate north of the 49th parallel at the Canadian Open Frisbee Championships and by creating the Toronto Ultimate League (Club). Since 1998, Canada has been ranked number one in the World Ultimate Rankings, several times in all divisions (including Open and Women's) according to the World Flying Disc Federation. In 2013, as a founding partner, the Toronto Ultimate Club presented Canada's first semi-professional ultimate team the Toronto Rush, to the Ultimate Frisbee Association (UFA) (originally branded as the American Ultimate Disc League (AUDL)). They finished their first season undefeated 18–0 and won the AUDL Championships. Disc ultimate has become one of today's fastest growing sports. In 2015, the International Olympic Committee (IOC) granted full recognition to the World Flying Disc Federation (WFDF) for flying disc sports including ultimate.

== Multi-sport events ==
The first major multi-sport event that the city of Toronto hosted was the 1976 Summer Paralympics. It was the fifth edition of the Paralympic Games and the first time it was hosted in Canada. Toronto also hosted the first ever World Masters Games in 1985 as well as the 1997 Special Olympics World Winter Games, the 2017 North American Indigenous Games, and the 2017 Invictus Games.

In 2009, Toronto submitted a bid to host the Pan American Games and Parapan American Games, subsequently winning the right to host the 2015 Pan Am Games.

Toronto submitted bids to host the Summer Olympic Games five times: 1960, 1964, 1976, 1996 and 2008. The closest it came to winning the games was in 2008, when it finished second to Beijing by a vote of 56–22. Varsity Stadium on the campus of the University of Toronto, hosted some of the matches of the Olympic football tournament of the 1976 Summer Olympics in Montreal. After successfully hosting both the 2015 Pan American Games, the city briefly considered another Olympic bid for the 2024 Summer Olympics, but on September 15, 2015, Toronto Mayor John Tory announced that the city would not be a candidate for a bid.

The city previously attempted to host the 1954 British Empire and Commonwealth Games, losing to Vancouver, and the 1999 Pan American Games, losing the Canadian bid race to Winnipeg.

== Sports culture ==
=== Rivalries ===
Due to their geographic locations, Toronto has an intense sports rivalry with several Canadian cities around the Quebec City–Windsor Corridor, in addition to American cities around the Great Lakes.

The Canadian football team, the Toronto Argonauts have a rivalry with the Hamilton Tiger-Cats since 1873, and is heightened during the Labour Day Classic). The Argonauts also share a rivalry with the Ottawa Redblacks and the Montreal Alouettes.

In ice hockey, the Toronto Maple Leafs have several rivalries with the oldest existing clubs in the National Hockey League, including the Montreal Canadiens, the Detroit Red Wings, and the Boston Bruins. The Maple Leafs also have a rivalry with the only other Ontario-based team in the NHL, the Ottawa Senators.

In basketball, the Toronto Raptors has a noted rivalry with the Brooklyn Nets.

In soccer, the Toronto FC have a rivalry with the Montreal Impact, referred to as the 401 Derby. The Toronto FC also have a rivalry with the Columbus Crew, competing with them over the Trillium Cup, a trophy named after the trillium, the official flower of Ontario, and the official wildflower of Ohio. A third rivalry Toronto FC has is with Seattle Sounders FC after facing off against them as the same opponent for all 3 of the club's MLS Cup finals appearances (2016 MLS Cup, 2017 MLS Cup, and 2019 MLS Cup).

In baseball, the Toronto Blue Jays have developed rivalries over the years with teams within their American League East division (New York Yankees, Boston Red Sox, Baltimore Orioles, Tampa Bay Rays) as a result of scheduling that sees them play each other more frequently than teams outside of it. Since 2015, the Blue Jays have developed a rivalry with the Texas Rangers that stems from their 2015 American League Division Series matchup where Jose Bautista hit a go-ahead home run in game No. 5 to win the series that sparked controversy due to his subsequent bat flip that upset the Rangers based on what was perceived as a violation of the unwritten rules of baseball, and yielded a beanball and bench-clearing brawl as retaliation in the following season.

=== Toronto's association with the colour blue ===
The colour of blue has been associated with the city of Toronto, its sports teams and its academic institutions for over a hundred years. City symbols such as the flag of Toronto, its coat of arms and city wordmark all reflect this association. Some of the oldest colleges and universities located within the original city of Toronto incorporated blue into their athletic nicknames including the University of Toronto Varsity Blues (established 1827), the Upper Canada College Blues (1829) and the St Michael's Kerry Blues (1852) while newer post-secondary institutions at Toronto Metropolitan University (1948), George Brown College (1967) and Humber College (1968) included blue in their school colours.

When the Argonaut Rowing Club was founded in 1872 the blue colours of Oxford and Cambridge universities (the "Double Blue") was adopted as the club colours. When the club went on to found the Toronto Argonauts football club with the same name a year later in 1873, the "Double Blue" colour was also adopted for the football field and has continued with the team nearly 150 years later.

Other major teams that adopted Toronto blue included the original Toronto Maple Leafs of baseball's International League from 1896 until 1967, the Marlboros of the OHA (1904), the Blueshirts of the NHA (1911) and the Arenas of the NHL (1917).

When Conn Smythe acquired the Toronto St. Patricks in 1927, in addition to the team being rebranded as the Maple Leafs, it was announced that the team had changed their colour scheme to blue and white, which they have worn ever since. While the Leafs say that blue represents the Canadian skies and white represents snow, another theory is that Smythe changed the colours as a nod to his school alma maters at Upper Canada College and the University of Toronto.

As various leagues expanded into the city the tradition of using blue in team identity continued including the Huskies of the NBA (1947), WHA's Toros (1973), baseball's Blue Jays (1977), the NASL Blizzard (1978), the Rock of the NLL (1999), and rugby's Arrows (2019).

When the Toronto Raptors joined the NBA in 1995, the original owners were given a six-month window to reap 100 per cent of merchandise profits sold in their region to help cover the cost of the franchise. To maximize those initial sales the choice was made to break with Toronto traditions and adopt a name and colour that would appeal to kids between the ages of six and ten with a focus on becoming an international brand. After a name the team contest narrowed the list down to ten names, the name Raptors with a base colour of purple was chosen after inspiration of the eight-year-old son of owner John Bitove. In 2006, the Raptors re-branded with red as their new base colour to market themselves beyond Toronto as "Canada's Team" with their national colour as the only Canadian NBA team after the Vancouver Grizzlies relocated to Memphis, Tennessee in 2001.

In 2007 Toronto FC joined Major League Soccer and also chose to distance itself from Toronto traditions by adopting red as its primary colour to reflect its status as the only Canadian team in the league. This status only lasted four seasons until their future rivals Vancouver Whitecaps FC (2011) and the Montreal Impact (2012) joined the league, ironically both in blue uniforms.

=== Sports museums ===
- Canada's Sports Hall of Fame was founded in Toronto in 1955, and was based at Exhibition Place between 1955 and 2006. It has since relocated to Calgary, Alberta.
- The Hockey Hall of Fame is an ice hockey museum located in Toronto, Ontario, Canada. Dedicated to the history of ice hockey, it is a museum and a hall of fame. It holds exhibits about players, teams, National Hockey League records, memorabilia and NHL trophies, including the Stanley Cup. Originally based in Kingston, Ontario, the Hockey Hall of Fame relocated to Toronto in 1958 where it was given space as a section of Canada's Sports Hall of Fame before becoming its own separate Hall of Fame facility within the same building in 1961. In 1993, the Hockey Hall of Fame relocated to its current location at the northwest corner of Yonge & Front Streets taking up an opulent section of Brookfield Place that once served as a branch of the Bank of Montreal.
- The Canadian Motorsport Hall of Fame was founded in 1993 by Lee Abrahamson and Gary Magwood assisted by Len Coates to celebrate the accomplishments and contributions of the Canadian motorsport communities. It was originally based at Exhibition Place, sharing the same facility as Canada's Sports Hall of Fame until 1997 when it relocated to Bay Street. In 2001, the Canadian Motorsport Hall of Fame began relocating to various temporary locations before deciding to become a virtual online museum today. Their annual induction ceremonies take place at the Metro Toronto Convention Centre in downtown Toronto.
- The Etobicoke Sports Hall of Fame was founded in 1994 and is located at the Ford Performance Centre in Etobicoke, Ontario. Their mission statement describes their purpose as "honour(ing), for all time, those athletes, administrators, officials, media and individuals who have achieved the highest standard of excellence in sport" who "encourage and inspire excellence in all fields of athletic endeavour within our community." The criteria for induction eligibility is being "any individual person or organization/team who has made a difference to our lives through their contribution to both amateur and/or professional sport or who has achieved outstanding and extraordinary success in the field of sport or who demonstrates exemplary values and/or personal characteristics and has made a defining contribution to his/her sport and who has lived or currently resides in Etobicoke or who has worked and/or had a significant impact to the Etobicoke community in the field of sport".
- The Ontario Sports Hall of Fame was founded in 1994 in Toronto. Currently they only host an online museum instead of a physical sports museum, but their administrative office is located in Toronto. Their annual induction ceremonies take place at the Metro Toronto Convention Centre in downtown Toronto.
- Canada Basketball, the governing body of basketball in Canada, hosts an online hall of fame museum with its mission statement being “to recognize, honour, immortalize and enshrine the contributions to the development and advancement of basketball in Canada or internationally.” While it does not have a physical sports museum, their administrative office is located in Toronto, & their annual induction ceremonies take place at various Toronto-based venues, most recently at the Gladstone House for their 2023 induction ceremony.
- The Leaside Sports Hall of Fame was founded in 2013 during the centennial year for the Leaside neighbourhood. Sponsored by the East York Foundation & located at Leaside Gardens outside its arena, their mission statement describes their purpose as serving as "a non-profit organization dedicated to celebrating and promoting excellence in sport at the recreational, competitive and elite levels in/from the Leaside community in Toronto" while "aim(ing) to foster a community where participation in recreational and competitive sport is valued, and where the achievements of athletes and the contributions of volunteers are recognized and honoured."
- The Toronto Sport Hall of Honour was founded in 2016 by the Municipal government of Toronto. Located at the Toronto Pan Am Sports Centre in Scarborough, Ontario as "a legacy of the 2015 Toronto Pan Am and Parapan Am Games", their mission statement describes their purpose as "celebrat(ing) the exceptional contributions and accomplishments of those who have inspired and/or brought recognition to Toronto through sport." Each year, a selection panel is responsible for determining the inductees for 9 different categories: Athletes of the year, Builder, City of Sport Lifetime Achievement, Coach of the Year, Community Sport Volunteer, Corporate Builder, Spirit of Sport Diversity and Inclusion, Sport Legend, & Team of the Year. Nominations are also open to the public via e-nomination forms provided through their website.

== Major league professional championships ==
Toronto is one of five North American cities (alongside Chicago, Los Angeles, Washington, D.C., and the New York Tri-state area) to have won titles in its five major leagues (MLB, NHL, NBA, MLS and either NFL or CFL), and the only one to have done so in the Canadian Football League.

The following is a list of when professional sports teams based in Toronto won their respective major league championship.

In addition to professional teams, several amateur teams in Toronto were also awarded major league trophies. The Grey Cup was initially awarded to the champions of Canadian rugby football, including both professional and amateur teams. Three amateur teams based in Toronto have won the Grey Cup, including the University of Toronto Varsity Blues in 1909, 1910, 1911, and 1920; the Toronto Balmy Beach Beachers in 1927 and 1930; and the Toronto RCAF Hurricanes in 1942. In 1954, a decade after the last amateur team won a Grey Cup, the only remaining amateur football union withdrew from Grey Cup competition and the trophy was transitioned into a purely professional trophy.

The Stanley Cup is another championship trophy that was originally open to amateurs and professional ice hockey teams. However, no amateur team based in Toronto was ever awarded the Stanley Cup. In 1909, the Allan Cup was created as a championship trophy for amateur hockey teams, with the Stanley Cup becoming a championship trophy awarded to professional teams.

=== Baseball ===
Toronto Blue Jays (MLB): 2 World Series titles

- 1992
- 1993

=== Basketball ===
Toronto Raptors (NBA): 1 NBA title

- 2019

=== Canadian football ===
Toronto Argonauts (CFL): 19 Grey Cups

- 6th Grey Cup (1914)
- 9th Grey Cup (1921)
- 21st Grey Cup (1933)
- 25th Grey Cup (1937)
- 26th Grey Cup (1938)
- 33rd Grey Cup (1945)
- 34th Grey Cup (1946)
- 35th Grey Cup (1947)
- 38th Grey Cup (1950)
- 40th Grey Cup (1952)
- 71st Grey Cup (1983)
- 79th Grey Cup (1991)
- 84th Grey Cup (1996)
- 85th Grey Cup (1997)
- 92nd Grey Cup (2004)
- 100th Grey Cup (2012)
- 105th Grey Cup (2017)
- 109th Grey Cup (2022)
- 111th Grey Cup (2024)

=== Hockey ===
Toronto Blueshirts (NHA): 1 Stanley Cup

- 1914

Toronto Maple Leafs (NHL): 13 Stanley Cups

- 1918
- 1922
- 1932
- 1942
- 1945
- 1947
- 1948
- 1949
- 1951
- 1962
- 1963
- 1964
- 1967

The hockey club won its first championship in 1918 as the Toronto Hockey Club (informally the Toronto Arenas), whereas its second championships (in 1922) was won when the club was named the Toronto St. Patricks. All subsequent championships won by the club were awarded when the club was named the Toronto Maple Leafs.

=== Soccer ===
Toronto Metros-Croatia (NASL): 1 Soccer Bowl

- 1976

Toronto FC (MLS): 1 MLS Cup

- 2017

== Impact of the COVID-19 pandemic ==
In March 2020, sports leagues throughout North America suspended their operations in response to the COVID-19 pandemic in the United States. Months later, a number of those sports leagues were able to resume their play behind closed doors while others either curtailed or cancelled their 2020 seasons altogether.

=== Playing through travel restrictions ===
Due to travel restrictions imposed by the Canadian government in response to the COVID-19 pandemic in Canada, many Toronto based teams in those leagues were unable to host games against American based teams until the travel restrictions were relaxed in July 2021. In response, various Toronto teams mitigated the issue by seeking venues in American host cities for home games against American based teams, or by hosting games in Toronto exclusively against Canadian-based teams:

- The Blue Jays' returned to play strategy for their 2020 "home" games featured playing in visitors ballparks as the home team for the first month until ultimately settling at Sahlen Field in Buffalo, New York as their home stadium for the duration of their abbreviated 60-game regular season. In 2021, the Blue Jays will play their first two months of their regular season home games at TD Ballpark in Dunedin, Florida which will last from April 8 until the end of May. From June 1 onwards, the Blue Jays will return to Sahlen Field in Buffalo, New York to play the remainder of their 2021 home games "until it is safe ... to return to play on home soil (at Rogers Centre)". On July 16, 2021, the Blue Jays received approval by the Canadian government for an exemption on border restrictions & played their first home game at Rogers Centre in Toronto on July 30, 2021, vs. the Kansas City Royals.
- Toronto FC's return to play strategy for their 2020 MLS season featured scheduling in 3 phases. The first phase featured teams participating in the MLS is Back Tournament hosted in a quarantined bubble with stringent COVID-19 testing at the ESPN Wide World of Sports Complex in Bay Lake, Florida. The tournament also featured round-robin matches which would count toward the regular season standings. This was followed by a second phase of scheduling that saw Canadian-based teams play one another exclusively, allowing for BMO Field to host home games. The third phase of scheduling saw TFC play U.S. based teams for the remainder of the season with home games played at Pratt & Whitney Stadium at Rentschler Field in East Hartford, Connecticut. For their 2021 MLS season, Toronto FC started their season playing their home games at Exploria Stadium in Orlando, Florida, the home stadium for Orlando City SC. On July 14, 2021, Toronto FC was granted approval by the Canadian government to resume hosting games in Toronto vs. American teams on the condition that "clubs and match officials travelling to Canada will be subject to public health protocols required of all individuals entering the country," and that "only fully vaccinated players and staff will be excluded from Canadian quarantine requirements." They played their first game since the pandemic at BMO Field vs Orlando City SC on July 17, 2021.
- The Raptors also returned to play at the ESPN Wide World of Sports Complex where the remainder of the 2019-20 NBA season and 2020 NBA playoffs were played as part of the 2020 NBA Bubble with daily COVID-19 testing. Their 2020–21 home games were played at Amalie Arena in Tampa, Florida in an abbreviated 72-game schedule with the Raptors missing the playoffs. The Raptors played their first home game at Scotiabank Arena since the pandemic on October 20, 2021, against the Washington Wizards.
- Unlike the other leagues, the NHL received an exemption to the travel restrictions, including an exemption from the mandatory 14-day self isolation upon entry into Canada, as part of their return to play in the 2020 NHL Bubble with Toronto & Edmonton serving as their 2 hub cities. This allowed for all playoff eligible teams based in Canada & American based teams entering Canada to participate on the condition that all team players and staff members remained isolated within designated secure zones (hotels, restaurants, practice facilities, and arena) which were all surrounded by a secured perimeter, and restricted themselves from access to or by the general public. Additionally, all members had to comply to daily COVID-19 testing, temperature testing, & symptom checks. This allowed the Maple Leafs to return to play at Scotiabank Arena in Toronto in a 5-game Stanley Cup qualifier round against the American-based Columbus Blue Jackets. Their 2020-21 NHL season was an abbreviated 56-game season played exclusively against other Canadian-based teams in a realigned "North Division" during the regular season, thereby allowing them to play their home games at Scotiabank Arena this season. The realigned division also allows for an all-Canadian matchup for the first 2 rounds of the 2021 Stanley Cup playoffs.
- The Toronto Six played in the 2021 NWHL bubble season at Herb Brooks Arena in Lake Placid, New York. Herb Brooks Arena hosted all NWHL season games and was also scheduled to host games for the 2021 Isobel Cup Playoffs. Shortly before the start of the Isobel Cup Playoffs, the season was suspended indefinitely due to positive cases of COVID-19 within the bubble. The season resumed with the start of the Isobel Cup playoffs which was played between March 26–27 at Warrior Ice Arena in Brighton, Massachusetts, with the top seeded Toronto Six being eliminated on the first day of play by the Boston Pride.
- In 2021, Raptors 905 played their 2021 NBA G League season & playoffs in a bubble at the ESPN Wide World of Sports Complex, which was also used as the same venue for the 2020 NBA Bubble, with daily COVID-19 testing. The G League regular season lasted an abbreviated 15 games, followed by 3 single game playoff rounds. The top seeded Raptors 905 were eliminated in the second round by the Delaware Blue Coats.
- The Toronto Marlies played their abbreviated 35-game 2020-21 AHL season exclusively against other Canadian-based teams in a realigned "North Division" during the season, like their parent club, the Toronto Maple Leafs. This allowed them to play their home games at Coca-Cola Coliseum that season. Although the Stockton Heat are normally based in Stockton, California, they were based in Calgary, Alberta for the 2020–21 AHL season to facilitate player transfers with their NHL parent club, the Calgary Flames, thereby allowing the Marlies to host games against them at Coca-Cola Coliseum as a North Division team. Unlike the Maple Leafs, the North Division, along with 3 other AHL Divisions, opted out of conducting a traditional 2021 Calder Cup Playoffs that season & did not issue a Calder Cup champion for the second straight year.
- For the 2021 Major League Rugby season, the Arrows temporarily relocated to Marietta, Georgia, to share Rugby ATL's facilities at Lupo Family Field.
- Toronto FC II began their 2021 USL League One season playing their first 3 home games at the Grande Sports World training facility in Casa Grande, Arizona, followed by 3 home games at Osceola Heritage Park in Kissimmee, Florida. They ultimately resumed playing their home games in Toronto on July 30, 2021, when they hosted Greenville Triumph SC at the BMO Training Ground.

=== Curtailed or cancelled seasons ===
In some instances, the impact of the COVID-19 pandemic forced some teams to curtail their season or cancel their season altogether:

- The Toronto Argonauts were unable to play in 2020 due to the CFL cancelling the 2020 CFL season. They resumed play in 2021 by playing their 1st game of the season on the road vs. the Calgary Stampeders on August 7, and playing their home opener vs. the Winnipeg Blue Bombers on August 21.
- The 2020 Toronto Rock season was curtailed after playing their 11th game of the season on March 8 in Toronto at Scotiabank Arena vs the Calgary Roughnecks, & the NLL would also go on to cancel the 2021 season. On May 11, 2021, the Rock announced that they would relocate to Hamilton, Ontario in part due to "significant reduction in operation costs significant reduction in game operations costs as well as the opportunities that exist to better connect with our fan base and most importantly grow that fan base and increase revenues." They also announced that the relocation would not yield a name change. The Rock resumed play in 2021 by playing their home opener in Hamilton at First Ontario Centre on December 4 vs the Albany FireWolves.
- The Toronto Marlies 2019–20 season was curtailed after playing their last game on the road vs. the Bridgeport Sound Tigers on March 11. The Marlies would resume play in 2021 by playing their 1st game of the season in Winnipeg vs. the Manitoba Moose on February 15, 2021, as a member of a revised all-Canadian North Division to avoid cross-border travel.
- Raptors 905's 2019–20 season was curtailed after playing their last game at home vs the College Park Skyhawks on March 11. They would resume play in 2021 by playing their 1st game of the season at the G-League bubble in Bay Lake, Florida vs. the Rio Grande Valley Vipers on February 10.
- Toronto FC II opted out of participating in the 2020 USL League One season due to COVID-19 restrictions, but resumed play for the 2021 season by playing their 1st game of the season in Casa Grande, Arizona vs. North Texas SC on May 22.

== See also ==
- Amateur sport in Toronto
- List of sports teams in Toronto
- Multiple major sports championship seasons
- CJCL (Toronto all-sports radio station, Sportsnet 590 The Fan)
- CHUM (AM) (Toronto all-sports radio station, TSN Radio 1050)
