= List of sports teams in Toronto =

Toronto, Ontario, is home to numerous professional, semi-professional, and university sports teams. The city is notable among Canadian cities in sports for having several professional and semi-professional teams United States leagues.

Below is a list of sports teams based in Toronto, as well as the year they were formed (and ended play for former teams).

== Professional teams ==
- AFC Toronto (Northern Super League) (2023)
- Inter Toronto FC (Canadian Premier League) (2018)
- Scarborough Shooting Stars (Canadian Elite Basketball League) (2021)
- Toronto Argonauts (Canadian Football League) (1873)
- Toronto Blue Jays (Major League Baseball) (1977)
- Toronto FC (Major League Soccer) (2005)
- Toronto FC II (MLS Next Pro) (2014)
- Toronto Kings (Global T20 Canada) (2026)
- Toronto Maple Leafs (Canadian Baseball League) (1969)
- Toronto Maple Leafs (National Hockey League) (1917)
- Toronto Marlies (American Hockey League) (2005)
- Toronto North (World TeamTennis) (2026)
- Toronto Polar Bears (Pro Padel League) (2023)
- Toronto Raptors (National Basketball Association) (1995)
- Toronto Rush (Ultimate Frisbee Association) (2013)
- Toronto Sceptres (Professional Women's Hockey League) (2023)
- Toronto Sixers (Canada Super60) (2025)
- Toronto Tempo (Women's National Basketball Association) (2024)

== Semi-professional teams ==
=== Canadian Soccer League ===
- FC Continentals (2018)
- FC Ukraine United (2006)
- Scarborough SC (2014)
- Serbian White Eagles (1968)

=== Ontario Premier League ===
- Alliance United FC (2018)
- Inter Toronto Pathway (2025)
- Master's FA (2014)
- North Toronto Nitros (2016)
- The Borough FC (2024)

=== Other ===
- Canadian Crusaders (Major League Indoor Soccer) (2024)
- TFC Academy (MLS Next) (2008)
- Toronto 6ixers (Professional Inline Hockey Association) (2025)

== Professional eSports teams ==
- Raptors Uprising GC (NBA 2K League) (2018)
- Toronto KOI (Call of Duty, Teamfight Tactics) (est. 2019)

== Amateur teams ==
=== Universities ===
- TMU Bold (Toronto Metropolitan University) (1948)
- Varsity Blues (University of Toronto) (1877)
- York Lions (York University) (1968)

=== Colleges ===
- Centennial Colts (1967)
- George Brown Huskies (1967)
- Humber Hawks (1968)
- Seneca Sting (1968)

=== Junior ===
- GTA Grizzlies (Canadian Junior Football League) (2014)
- North York Rangers (Ontario Junior Hockey League) (1969)
- North York Renegades (Greater Metro Junior A Hockey League) (2014)
- St. Michael's Buzzers (Ontario Junior Hockey League) (1917)
- Toronto Beaches (OLA Junior A Lacrosse League) (1991)
- Toronto Patriots (Ontario Junior Hockey League) (1996)

=== Ontario Australian Football League ===
- Central Blues
- Etobicoke Kangaroos
- High Park Demons
- Toronto Downtown Dingos
- Toronto Eagles
- Toronto Rebels

=== Other ===
- Handball Club Toronto (2018)
- Ontario Blues (Canadian Rugby Championship) (2009)
- Toronto City Saints (Ontario Rugby League) (2010)
- Toronto Raiders (Major League Quadball) (2019)

== Defunct teams ==
=== Ice hockey ===
- Toronto 228th Battalion (National Hockey Association) (1916–17)
- Toronto Aeros (National Women's Hockey League) (1998–2006; became the Mississauga Aeros for 2006–07)
- Toronto Attack (Greater Metro Junior A Hockey League) (2012–17)
- Toronto Blueshirts (National Hockey Association) (1911–17)
- Toronto Furies (Canadian Women's Hockey League) (2010–2018)
- Toronto Jr. Canadiens (Ontario Junior Hockey League) (1972)
- Toronto Marlboros (Ontario Hockey League) (1904–89)
- Toronto Ontarios (National Hockey Association) (1913–14)
- Toronto Roadrunners (American Hockey League) (2003–04)
- Toronto Shamrocks (National Hockey Association) (1915)
- Toronto St. Michael's Majors (Ontario Hockey League) (1906–62, 1996–2007)
- Toronto Tecumsehs (National Hockey Association) (1912–13)
- Toronto Toros (World Hockey Association) (1973–76)
- Toronto Six (Premier Hockey Federation) (2020–23)

=== Soccer ===
- North York Astros (Canadian Soccer League) (1990–14)
- SC Toronto (Canadian Soccer League) (2001–12)
- Toronto Blizzard (North American Soccer League) (1971–84; known as the Toronto Metros (1971–74) and Toronto Metros-Croatia (1975–78))
- Toronto Blizzard (Canadian National Soccer League) (1985–86); (Canadian Soccer League) (1987–92); (American Professional Soccer League) (1993)
- Toronto City (Eastern Canada Professional Soccer League) (1961–65); (United Soccer Association) (1967)
- Toronto Falcons (National Professional Soccer League (1967), North American Soccer League (1968)
- Toronto FC III (League1 Ontario) (2014-2018; 2024)
- Toronto Greenbacks (North American Soccer Football League) (1946–47)
- Toronto Lynx (A-League) (1997–2004); (USL First Division) (2005–06); (USL Premier Development League) (2007-14)
- Toronto Lady Lynx (USL Women's soccer) (2005–2011)
- Toronto Rockets (American Professional Soccer League) (1994)
- Toronto Shooting Stars (National Professional Soccer League) (1996–97)
- Toronto ThunderHawks (National Professional Soccer League) (2000–01)

=== Lacrosse ===
- Toronto Maple Leafs (International Lacrosse League) (1932)
- Toronto Maple Leafs (National Lacrosse Association) (1968)
- Toronto Nationals (Major League Lacrosse) (2009–10)
- Toronto Shooting Stars (National Lacrosse League) (1972–4)
- Toronto Shooting Stars (Canadian Lacrosse League) (2012–13)
- Toronto Tecumsehs (International Lacrosse League) (1931–32)
- Toronto Tomahawks (National Lacrosse League) (1974)

=== Other ===
- Balmy Beach Saints (O.A.F.L.) (1992–97)
- Toronto Arrows (Major League Rugby) (2019–2023)
- Toronto Balmy Beach Beachers (Ontario Rugby Football Union) (1924–57)
- Toronto Defiant (Overwatch League) (2018-2024)
- Toronto Huskies (Basketball Association of America) (1946–47)
- Toronto Maple Leafs (International League) (1896–1967)
- Toronto Northmen (World Football League) (scheduled to join in 1974 but never played a game)
- Toronto Phantoms (Arena Football League) (2001–02)
- Toronto Planets (Roller Hockey International) (1993)
- Toronto Rebellion (Rugby Canada National Junior Championship) (2009)
- Toronto Rifles (Continental Football League) (1965–67)
- Toronto Titans (International Swimming League) (2020–21)
- Toronto Tornados (Continental Basketball Association) (1983–85)
- Toronto Torpedoes (Major League Roller Hockey) (1998)
- Toronto Triumph (Legends Football League) (2011–12)
- Toronto Wolfpack (Rugby Football League) (2017–20; 2023)
- Toronto Xtreme (Rugby Canada Super League) (1999–2007; known as Toronto Renegades (1999–2002))
- Toronto-Buffalo Royals (World Team Tennis) (1974)

== See also ==
- Sports in Toronto
- Amateur sport in Toronto
- CJCL (AM) (Toronto's all-sports radio station, The FAN 590)
- CHUM (AM) (Toronto all-sports radio station, TSN Radio 1050)
