= Canada national Australian rules football team =

Canada
- Nickname(s): The Northwind
- Governing body: AFL Canada

Rankings
- Current: ▼11th (as of October 2022)

First international
- United States 75 – 55 Canada (1999)

International Cup
- Appearances: 6 (first in 2002)
- Best result: 5th (2014)

The Canada national Australian rules football team represents Canada in Australian rules football. The men's side is known as the Northwind (French: Vent du Nord) while the women's side is known as the Northern Lights. The national team is selected by AFL Canada the governing body for Australian rules football in Canada.

Northwind players are selected from the best Canadian-born players from the club teams across Canada.

The team plays in international tournaments, including the Australian Football International Cup and the 49th Parallel Cup.

== Identity ==
The Northwind's guernsey has the Maple leaf, the floral emblem of Canada, in the national colours of red and white.

== History ==
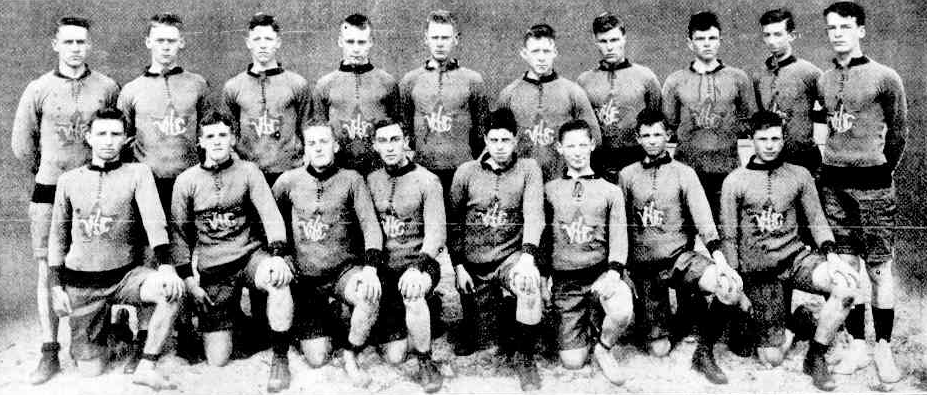
Canadian Cadets Australian Football Team in August 1912

The first team to represent Canada in the sport was a junior team aged 18 to 20 known as the "Canadian Cadets" to play a series of internationals against teams from the United States and Australia in 1912. While the tour itself was unsuccessful and controversial, the team won around half of their matches on their Australian tour.

A senior team formed in 1993 to compete against the British Australian Rules Football League, which it defeated and remained undefeated in successive contests in 1994 and 1995. In its first 49th Parallel Cup match against the USA Revolution in 1999 it was defeated, after which the match became an annual event. In these early competitions, Australian players residing in Canada were eligible for representation.

The first All-Canadian team was to compete in the 2001 Atlantic Alliance Cup in London. The team lost all of its matches against Great Britain, Denmark, the US and Ireland.

Canada competed in the 2002 Australian Football International Cup, finishing 9th. In the 2005 Australian Football International Cup it improved its result, finishing 7th.

At the 2007 49th Parallel Cup at Thunderbird Stadium, Vancouver Canada posted its first win against the United States.

Canada once again improved at the 2008 Australian Football International Cup finishing 6th.

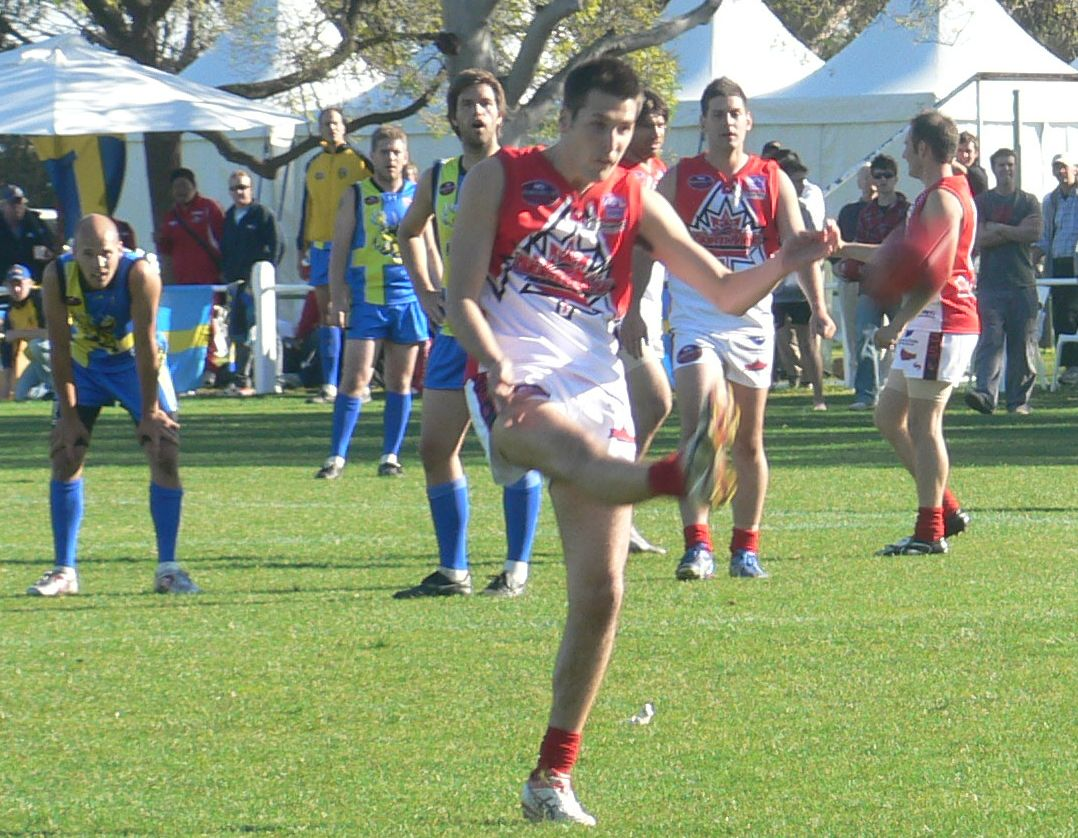
Canada's Scott Fleming kicks a long range goal against Sweden in the 2008 International Cup

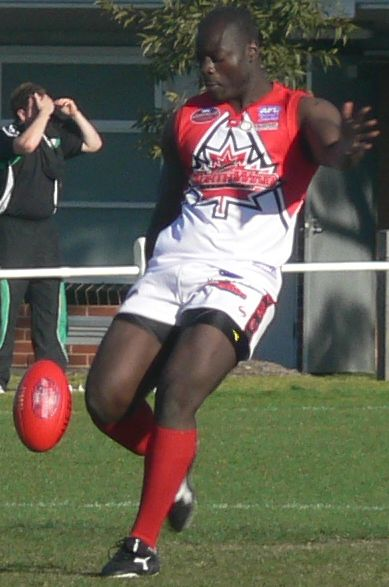
Northwind's All-International ruckman Manny Matata kicking a drop punt

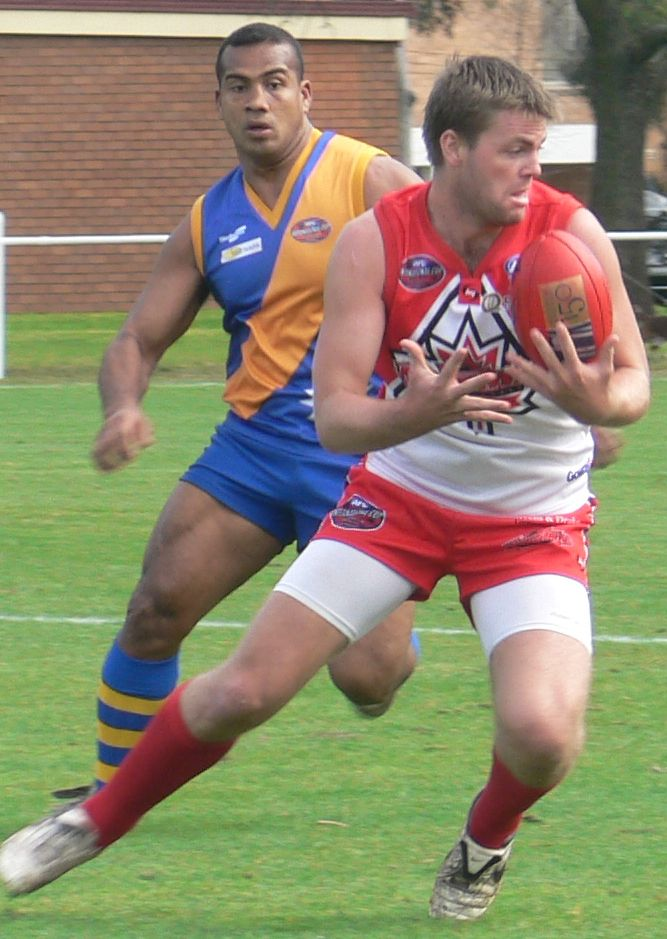
Canadian player evades a Nauruan opponent

Its first Women's 49th Parallel Cup win against the United States came in 2009.

In the 2011 Australian Football International Cup the Northwind finished 10th.

== Notable players ==
Stefan Leyhane, Northwind's Captain (2003–2009) was also the only Canadian recipient of the 2002 International All Star Team.

Northwind's best and fairest player (from the 2005 International Cup) was Paul Loughnane.

Northwind's best and fairest player from the 2008 International Cup was Aaron "Azza" Falcioni.

Northwind had two players named to the 2008 World Team: Emanuel Matata at Ruckman, and Scott Fleming at Forward.

Northwind had one player named to the 2011 World Team: Steve Rutledge.

Northwind had two players named to the 2014 World Team: Nathan Strom and Neil Casey.

Northwind had one player named to the 2017 World Team: Eric Klein

== Australian Football International Cup Results ==
The Northwind have competed at the Australian Football International Cup since their first appearance in 2002. The International Cup is a competition where players that are citizens of the countries who are competing are the only players allowed to play (no expatriate Australians are permitted to play, with teams composed solely of amateurs who must be nationals of the country they represent).

In the 2002 Australian Football International Cup the Canada Northwind finished 9th of 11 teams.
Round 1: Ireland 7.14 (56) def. Canada 4.7 (31) - Trevor Barker Beach Oval, Sandringham, Melbourne
Round 2: Canada 4.11 (38) def. South Africa 1.5 (11)
Round 3: New Zealand 10.8 (68) def. Canada 2.6 (18)
Round 4: USA 8.4 (52) def. Canada 1.1 (7)
Round 5: Samoa 9.15 (69) def. Canada 0.5 (5)
9th/10th Place Playoff: Canada 6.5 (41) def. Japan 5.2 (32)

In the 2005 Australian Football International Cup the Northwind finished 7th of 10 teams.
Round 1: Ireland 4.7 (31) def. Canada 3.5 (23)
Round 2: Papua New Guinea 5.11 (41) def. Canada 4.3 (27)
Round 3: Samoa 7.4 (46) def. Canada 6.6 (42)
Round 4: Great Britain 3.7 (25) def. 3.5 Canada (23)
Qualifying Final: Canada def. Spain (Spain forfeited).
7th/8th Place Playoff: Canada 4.5 (29) def. South Africa 2.6 (18)

In the 2008 Australian Football International Cup the Northwind finished 6th of 16 teams:
Round 1: Canada Northwind 18.22 (130) def. Finland Icebreakers 0.0 (0) - Western Oval
Round 2: Canada Northwind 16.12 (108) def. Sweden Elks 1.1 (7) - Ransford Oval
Round 3: Ireland Warriors 4.6 (30) def. Canada Northwind 2.2 (14) - Reid Oval
Finals Round 1: Canada Northwind 7.7 (49) def. Japan Samurais 0.3 (3) - Walter Oval
5th/6th Place Playoff: Nauru Chiefs 12.8 (80) def. Canada Northwind 7.7 (49) - Ransford Oval

In the 2011 Australian Football International Cup the Northwind finished 10th of 18 teams
Group 6 - Match 1: Canada 2.0 (12) def. by United States 2.3 (15) - Blacktown International Sportspark 2
Group 6 - Match 2: Canada 3.6 (24) def. Peres Team for Peace 0.0 (0) - Blacktown International Sportspark 2
Division 1 - Group 1 - Match 1: Canada 2.3 (15) def. by Great Britain 6.8 (44) - Blacktown International Sportspark 2
Division 1 - Group 1 - Match 3: Canada 3.2 (20) def. by New Zealand 5.9 (39) - Blacktown International Sportspark 1
Division 1 Semi-Finals: Canada 13.8 (86) def. Japan 2.1 (13) - McAllister Oval
9th/10th Place Playoff: Canada 6.4 (40) def. by Tonga 6.10 (46) - Ransford Oval

In the 2014 Australian Football International Cup the Northwind finished 5th of 18 teams.
Pool C - Round 1: Canada 19.5 (119) def. China 0.1 (1) - McAlister Oval
Pool C - Round 2: Canada 2.8 (20) def. by USA 8.3 (51) - Ransford Oval
Pool C - Round 3: Canada 20.10 (130) def. Sweden 0.0 (0) - Ben Kavanagh Reserve
Division 1 Semi Finals: Canada 9.15 (69) def. France 2.3 (15) - Ransford Oval
Division 1 Championship (5th/6th Place Playoff): Canada 9.7 (61) def. Tonga 7.6 (48) - McAlister Oval

== 2005 International Cup squad ==
Player	Club
Brown, Rohan	Toronto Downtown Dingos
Buczkowski, Chris	Toronto Downtown Dingos
Burkin, Jeff	Red Deer Magpies
Butcher, Mike	Toronto Downtown Dingos
Cunning, Chris (VC)	Toronto Downtown Dingos
Dimacakos, Anastasios	Toronto Eagles
Dimacakos, George	Toronto Eagles
Duffy, Kevin	Lakeshore Rebels
Duffy, Sean	Lakeshore Rebels
Enright, Austin	Victoria Lions
Falcioni, Aaron	Toronto Eagles
Holmes, Clayton	Etobicoke Kangaroos
Kidd, Matt	Red Deer Magpies
Lagan, Adrian	Calgary Kangaroos
Leyhane, Stefan (C)	Broadview Hawks
Logel, Greg	Guelph Gargoyles
Loughnane, Paul	Mississauga Demons
McElwain, Rob	Windsor Mariners
McLean, Kevin	Broadview Hawks
Minaker, Kevin	Toronto Eagles
Mintz, Richard	Broadview Hawks
Moussadji, Yoni	Toronto Downtown Dingos
Muller, Phil	Etobicoke Kangaroos
Nisker, Andrew	Toronto Downtown Dingos
Parks, Jason	Arizona Hawks
Paterson, Adam	Etobicoke Kangaroos
Robinson, Jason (DVC)	Etobicoke Kangaroos
Siddiqui, Adam	Lakeshore Rebels
Simnett, Dale	Mississauga Demons
Smith, Darrell	Red Deer Magpies
Tumak, Ken	Windsor Mariners
Tumber, Dave	Etobicoke Kangaroos
Van Gelder Mark	Toronto Eagles
Wells, David	Toronto Downtown Dingos
White, Chris	Victoria Lions

== See also ==
- AFL Canada
- Australian Rules Football in Canada
- Australian Football International Cup
