= Quebec Saints =

- Full name: Québec Saints Australian Football Club
- Nickname: Saints
- Sport: Australian rules football
- Founded: 2008
- First season: 2008
- League: AFL Quebec
- Colours: Blue / White
- Anthem: "Saints go marching in"
- President: Governed by AFL Quebec
- Head coach: Nathan Jacobs

The Québec Saints (French: Saints du Québec) is an Australian rules football club based in Montréal, Quebec, Canada.

== History ==
The Québec Saints were founded by Luke Anderson in early 2008. The team joined the Toronto-based Ontario Australian Football League's 'Rec Footy' program the same year competing against the Central Blues and Broadview Hawks reserve squads.

In late 2008 the Québec Saints divided their squad into two 9-a-side 'Metro' teams (the Montréal Saints, Laval Bombers and later in 2009 a third team the Pointe Claire Power) forming the basis of what is now known as AFL Quebec (prior to 2012 known as the Eastern Canadian Australian Football League or ECAFL). The Québec Saints now act as the representative team of AFL Québec.

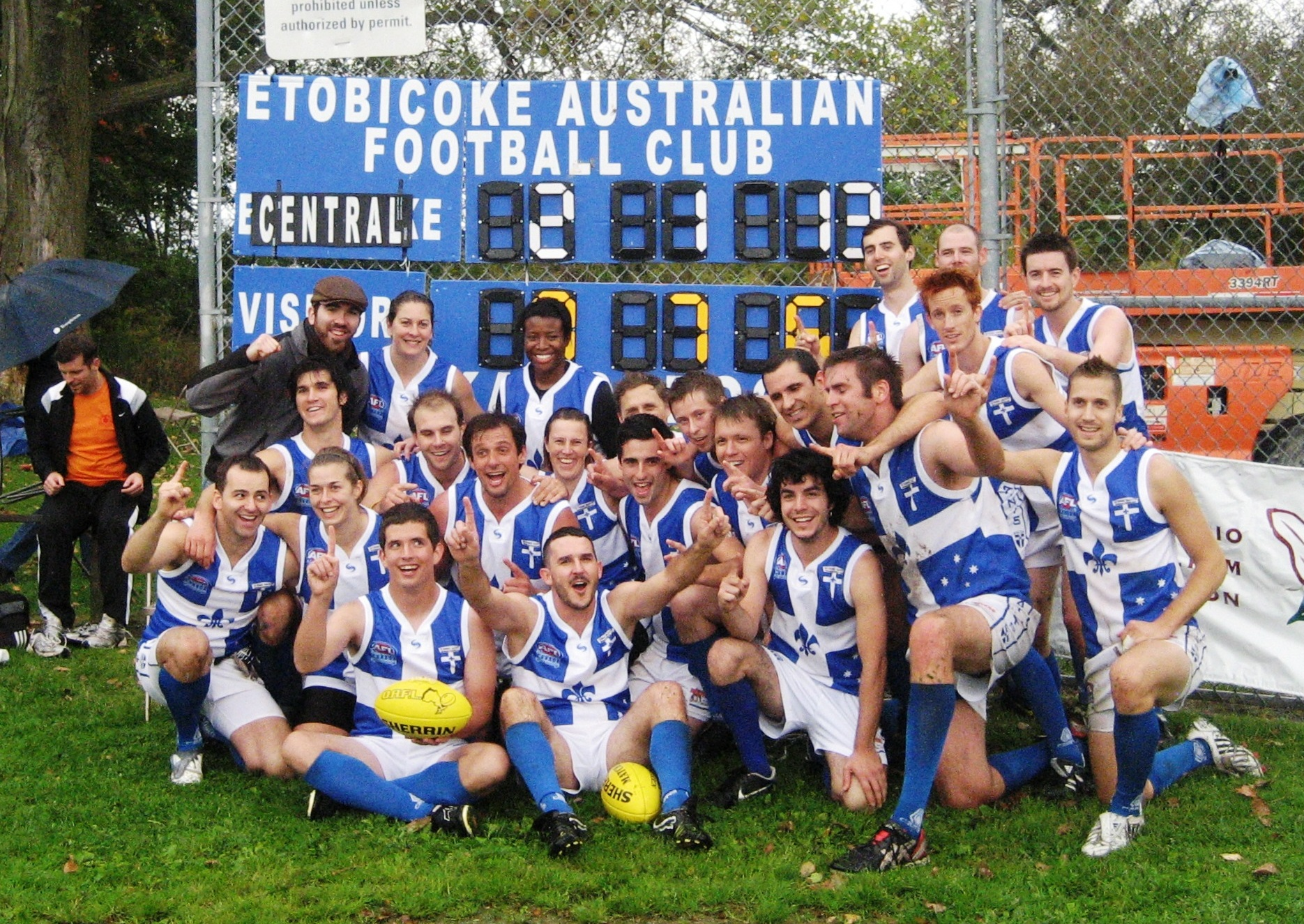
Quebec Saints 2010 Ontario AFL Division 2 Premiership team

In 2009 the OAFL relaunched 'Rec' Footy as OAFL Division 2. Five teams took part in the inaugural season including the Central Blues, Etobicoke Roos, Toronto Eagles, Broadview Hawks and Québec Saints. The Saints competed in the division for two years. The team finally withdrew from the competition because of the extreme travel requirements. From 2011 onwards the Saints focused on playing exhibition matches and sending representatives to the United States Nationals tournament.

== 2008 ==
Just 49 days after the Saints conducted their first training session the team took on the Central Blues Reserves squad in Ottawa. In an upset the Saints won by four goals. The Saints suffered a loss in their second match against the Broadview Hawks later in the year. These matches between the three teams were the catalyst for the Ontario Australian Football League to consider an official second-tier competition.

== 2009 ==
Before the season began the Saints formed a partnership with the Ottawa Swans and became co-tenants of the Rideau Carleton Raceway along with the Ottawa division one club. After finishing the regular season on top of the ladder the Saints defeated the Central Blues by 103 points in the first semi-final to earn a berth in the inaugural OAFL Division 2 Grand Final.

On October 3, 2009, the Québec Saints co-coached by Shane Blight and Matthew Wood, and captained by Cameron Stark, defeated the Broadview Hawks by 19 points in the Grand Final at Humber College North in Toronto. They Saints were awarded Mike Pyke Cup, the trophy named after the Sydney Swans ruckman, the first Canadian to play in the AFL. The Best players on the day included forward Mick Lacy, on-ballers Luke Anderson and Ben Vawser, as well as defender Renaud Carbonnel. On-baller Cam Stark claimed best on ground honours for the match.

2009 also saw the Québec Saints develop a women's team called Montréal Angels. The Angels played a series of matches against the Montréal Shamrocks GAA team and the newly formed Toronto Central Blues women's team.

In August 2009, club captain Cam Stark became the first Québec Saint player to represent his/her country when he played for Canada Northwind in the 49th Parallel Cup against the United States in Mason, Ohio, USA. Montréal Angels sisters Margo Legault and her younger sister Aimee Legault (who also both played for the Québec Saints) were named members of the women's national team after their performances at the 2009 U.S. Nationals in October.

== 2010 ==
The Saints entered the 2010 OAFL Division 2 season under new full-time coach Luke Anderson. The team ended the regular season with a 7–1 win–loss record and once again finished top of the ladder. The only loss of the season was to arch-rival club the Toronto Central Blues. The Saints then went on to defeat the Central Blues by 66 points in the 2nd Semi-final earning themselves a spot in their second consecutive Grand Final. After the Central Blues defeated the Toronto Rebel Dogs in the Preliminary Final, they advanced to the Grand Final where they once again met Québec. The Saints went on to defeat the Blues by 48 points and claim their second premiership. Saints midfielder Darrin Haverhoek was named best on ground for the match.

== 2011 ==
Prior to the 2011 season the Saints announced they were withdrawing from the OAFL Division 2 competition. The club cited the enormous travel requirements and the subsequent financial burden as the reasons they would have to reluctantly withdraw. The Saints used the year to focus on growing the local ECAFL (now AFL Quebec) competition. As a result, the Québec Saints did not participate in any official representative matches throughout the regular season. Two Saints players entered the U.S. Nationals competition forming an alliance squad with three other clubs in division 4. The combine team made it through to the Grand Final where it lost by six points.

== 2012 ==
The Saints played a series of exhibition matches throughout 2012, once again sending players to represent the team at the U.S. Nationals. The first representative match of the year saw the Saints travel to Boston to take on the Boston River Rats. The young inexperienced squad performed well but were soundly beaten. The team sent three players to partner the Fort Lauderdale Fighting Squids in Division 4 of the U.S. Nationals. The team was bundled out of the pool stages losing only one match to the Des Moines Roosters, the eventual champions of the division. The Québec Saints rounded out their season with a match against the Ottawa Swans branded the "Pony Fall Classic". After a tight first half the Saints run away with the match in the third term eventually winning by seven goals.

== Club Honour Board ==
| Year | Win/Loss | Finishing position | League | President | Coach | Captain | Best and Fairest | Leading Goal Kicker | Rookie Of The Year |
|---|---|---|---|---|---|---|---|---|---|
| 2008 | 1-1 | N/A | OAFL 'Rec' Footy | L.Anderson | A.Williams | V.Pottier | D.Barker/J.Lavoie | A.Williams (6) | |
| 2009 | 7-2 | Premiers | OAFL Division 2 | L.Anderson | A.Williams/S.Blight | C.Stark | C.Stark/B.Vawser | S.Blight (9) | J-R Theis |
| 2010 | 9-1 | Premiers | OAFL Division 2 | L.Anderson | L.Anderson | M.Wilson | C.Stark/M.Wilson | C.Beaman (11) | N.Pouessel |
| 2011 | 3-1 | Runner-Up | U.S. Nationals Div 4 | R.Carbonnel/N.Koch | M.Wilson | M.Wilson | TBD | TBD | TBD |
| 2012 | 2-1 | Pool Stage | U.S. Nationals Div 4 | AFL Quebec | N.Jacobs | TBD | Ronan Shaughnessy | Paul Fairbrother | Guy-Joel Rocher |
| 2013 | N/A | N/A | TBD | AFL Quebec | TBD | TBD | TBD | TBD | TBD |
| 2014 | TBC | TBC | TBC | AFL Quebec | TBC | TBC | TBC | TBC | TBC |
| 2015 | TBC | Premiers | U.S. Nationals Div 2 | AFL Quebec | D.Robinson | TBD | TBD | TBD | TBD |

== Premierships ==
- 2009 (OAFL Division 2)
- 2010 (OAFL Division 2)
- 2015 (U.S Nationals Division 2)
- 2017 (U.S Nationals Division 2)
