= Ottawa Swans =

Australian rules football club

Names
- Full name: Ottawa Swans Australian Football Club
- Nickname(s): Swans, Swannies, Bloods
- Motto: The North Remembers

2025 season

Club details
- Founded: 2006
- Colours: Red and White
- Competition: AFL Ontario
- President: Robert Harbic
- Coach: Trent McIlroy(M); Jack McDonald (W)
- Captain(s): Greg Bridges, Geoff Coventry & Benjamin Stanzal (M); Fee Houssein, Evaline Harmsen & Alanna Richardson (W)
- Premierships: 2014(W - AFLO) 2015(W - AFLQ) 2016(W - AFLQ) 2018(M - AFLO) 2019(M - AFLO) 2024(W+ - AFLO) 2025(W+ - AFLO)
- Ground: Manotick Polo Club/Bloods Park

Other information
- Official website: www.ottawaswans.com Swans Instagram

The Ottawa Swans are an Australian rules football club based in Ottawa, Ontario, Canada.

The club is notable as being the first and currently only Australian rules football club to represent the city of Ottawa.

The Ottawa Swans Australian Football Club played 3 exhibition games in 2007 before becoming a not-for-profit society in 2008. It entered the AFL Ontario (OAFL) as a member team in 2008, playing home games on a pitch built in the infield of the Rideau Carleton Raceway in Ottawa's south end.

The inaugural team of the Ottawa Swans Australian Football Club was led on the field by captain Steve Spurrell and coached by Richard Keane, who also played in the majority of games.

The Swans' first victory (as part of the Ontario Australian Football League) occurred on 11 July 2009 in the 3rd annual Canada Day Cup. The Swans defeated the Guelph Gargoyles 13.8.86 to 3.7.25 at the Rideau Carleton Raceway. It took the Swans 20 games to get their first win (13 losses in the first season and 6 in the second).

The Swans posted their first away victory in round 10 of the 2009 season against the High Park Demons at Humber College North. The final score was 12.6.78 to 3.7.25 .

2012 saw the introduction of the women's team, finishing a very successful inaugural season in 2nd spot after the home and away season and 3rd overall after being defeated by the Hamilton Wildcats in the second week of finals.

The Swans' Men's first finals (post-season) berth occurred in season 2013 after finishing the season in 5th spot. They were defeated in the first round Elimination Final by the Toronto Rebels 5.10-40 to 1.9-15

In season 2014, the Swans women's squad won the first premiership in the club's history, defeating the Hamilton Wildcats in the Grand Final 7.9.51 to 2.2.14.

For the 2015 season the Women's team joined AFL Quebec, a 9-a-side competition, and split their team in two, competing as the Carleton Warriors and Rideau Shamrocks. The Men's team remained in AFL Ontario. The Carleton Warriors went on the win back to back Premierships in 2015 & 2016.

2018 saw the Ottawa Swans Men's team win their maiden premiership. This was due to the leadership of "Rocket" Frank, Nathan Strom and Matt Powell who were instrumental in building a competitive culture and recruiting Canadian players. After a perfect season having won all 12 regular season games, the Swans won all three finals including the Grand Final over the 2017 premiers the Toronto Eagles at Humber College South 10.10 70 - 6.5 41. The Women's side fought hard all season in their return to the AFLO. They took the battle to the Roos in the Grand Final, but lost.

In 2019, the Ottawa Swans Men's team continued to find success, winning all their regular season games and final matches en route to hard-fought victory against the Hamilton Wildcats to claim back to back Premierships. The Women's team put together an impressive regular season with only one loss but were not able to replicate their finals magic.

In 2020/2021, the AFL Ontario season was cancelled due to the COVID-19 pandemic.

In 2024, the Pony Platter, a preseason exhibition tournament, expanded further to include the New York Magpies, Boston Demons, High Park Demons, and Edmonton AFC in addition to the Quebec Saints and Nova Scotia Pirates. This expansion also led to the introduction of a second playing field. The Swans introduced a new Indigenous jersey in collaboration with Kanyen’keha Artist Kory Parkin, which was unveiled at their Home Opener on June 8, 2024, during their designated Indigenous Round. A Pre-Game ceremony was held with a land acknowledgement and song from Mr. Greg Meekis, an Ojibway Cree from Sandy Lake First Nation, Knowledge Keeper and Cultural Resource Coordinator with the Odawa Native Friendship Centre, following by Anishinabe Hoop dancer Mekhena performing.

The Women's+ side finished the season with an undefeated record, the first in the AFLO comp since 2015. The Swans would defeat the Hamilton Wildcats in the Grand Final.

== Club awards ==
	(Men's) Best & Fairest	(Men's) Runner Up Men	(Women's) Best & Fairest	(Women's) Runner Up Women	Life Members
2024	Ben Stanzel	Tristan Picketts & James Young	Lannie Richardson	Vivian Nguyen	Amanda Paradis & Rod Frank
2023	James Clock	Riley Turpin	Caroline Leduc	Briana Fayad	
2022	Jordan Harcombe	James Clock	Charlotte Biot	Caroline Leduc	Emma Dickinson & Jacob Plunkett-Latimer
2019	Cory Townder	Cameron Brown	Holly Vachon	Charlotte Biot	Greg Simpson & Nathan Strom & Matthew Powell
2018	Cameron Ralph	Cameron Brown	Vivian Nguyen	Rebecca Rousseau	Michael Beall & Joel Dawes & Yaser Abou Elenein
2017	Nathan Strom	Greg Bridges	Anke Patzelt	Holly Vachon	
2016	Alex Huard, Blair Oliver, Nathan Strom	Greg Bridges	Vivian Nguyen	Holly Vachon	
2015	Nathan Strom	Joel Crummins	Holly Costanza	Vivian Nguyen	Lisa Dalla Rosa
2014	Tom Stafford	Joel Crummins	Aimee Legault	Vivian Nguyen	Alp Oran
2013	Nathan Strom	Brendan Woods	Emma Dickinson	Kirsten Bodashefsky	Chris Lockhart
2012	Darren Roffey	Mike Kozlowski	Emma Dickinson	Holly Costanza	Christopher MacLean
2011	Darren Roffey	Blake Hurley			
2010	Darren Roffey	Ryan Gregory			Tammy Bowen & Corey Bowen
2009	Luke Walsh	Darren Roffey & Richard Keane			Ray Kaduck
2008	Luke Walsh	Darren Roffey			Steve Spurrell & Richard Keane

	(Men's) Rookie Of The Year	(Women's) Rookie Of The Year
2024	James Young	Lannie Richardson
2023	Clarence Gay	Isabel Kleinbub
2022	Matthew Makin	Evaline Harmsen
2019	Geoff Coventry	Filssan Houssein
2018	Brent Williams & Riley Joseph	Erica Saabath
2017	Greg Layman	Krystal Novac
2016	Pablo Juarez	Belinda Wozniak
2015	Ian Baldwin	Kelly Cambridge
2014	Jordan Hardcombe	Lauren Stoot
2013	Brendan Woods	Roberta Kramchynsky
2012	Tyler MacLellan	
2011	Thomas Delaney	
2010	Jay Goldhawk	
2009	Ryan Nader & Sean Robertson-Tait	
2008	Ryan Gregory	

	(Men's) Most Consistent	(Women's) Most Consistent
2024	Andrew MacDonald	Isabel Kleinbub & Amanda Irwin
2023	Corey Herrington	Filssan Houssein
2022	Joshua La Porta	Kyla Borden
2019	Yaser Abou Elenein & Joshua La Porta	Margaret Werniuk
2018	Cameron Brown	Lisa Dalla Rosa
2017	Cameron Brown	Holly Vachon
2016	Morgan Whyte	Vivian Nguyen
2015	Morgan Whyte	Vivian Nguyen
2014	Darren Roffey & Matthew Powell	Aimee Legault
2013	Nathan Strom	Catherine Geci
2012	Darren Roffey	Holly Costanza
2011	Darren Roffey	
2010	Darren Roffey	
2009	Darren Roffey	
2008	Richard Keane	

	(Men's) Best Canadian	Men's Best in Finals	Women's Best in Finals
2024	Not Awarded	Not Awarded	Not Awarded
2023	Not Awarded	Not Awarded	Not Awarded
2022	Not Awarded	Not Awarded	Not Awarded
2019	Greg Bridges/Mic Masek	Cameron Brown	Kristina Bromley
2018	Jordan Harcombe	Nathan Strom	Erica Saabath
2017	Mic Masek		
2016	Morgan Whyte		
2015	Nathan Strom		
2014	Guy Joel Rocher		
2013	Mike Kozlowski		
2012	Mike Kozlowski		
2011	Mike Kozlowski/Jay Goldhawk		
2010	Chris Peck		
2009	Chris Lockhart		
2008	Jake Plunkett-Latimer		

	(Men's) Best Defender	(Women's) Best Defender
2024	Not Awarded	Not Awarded
2023	Not Awarded	Not Awarded
2022	Corey Herrington	Michelle Huard
2019	Lachie Brown	Harmony Sluiman
2018		Michelle Huard
2017		Alana Sluiman
2016		Nathalie Presseau
2015		Kelly Cambridge
2014		Catherine Geci

	(Men's) Most Improved	(Women's) Most Improved
2024		
2023	Andrew MacDonald	Kyla Borden
2022	Michael Masek	Leah McNamee
2019	Greg Layman	Charlotte Biot
2018	Mic Masek	Margret Werniuk
2017	Derek Picketts	Courtney Diotte
2016	Michael Beall	Beth Sheffield
2015	Alex Huard	Margaret Werniuk
2014	Bogdan Rotaru	Vivian Nguyen
2013	Jake Plunkett-Latimer	Holly Costanza
2012	Alec Campbell	
2011	Mike Kozlowski	
2010	Chris Peck/Ryan Nader	
2009	Zac Plunkett-Latimer	
2008	Chris Lockhart	

	(Men's) Goalkicking Award	(Women's) Goalkicking Award
2025	Jordan Harcombe	Abby McDonald
2024	Geoffrey Coventry	Amanda Irwin
2023	Geoffrey Coventry (11)	Caroline Leduc (5)
2022	Jordan Harcombe (9)	Caroline Leduc (3)
2019	Cory Townder (31)	Amanda Smith
2018	Jordan Harcombe (31)	Krystal Novac (15)
2017	Matthew Powell	Amanda Paradis & Holly Vachon
2016	Matthew Powell (31)	Belinda Wozniak
2015	Matthew Powell & Nathan Strom (18)	Holly Costanza (22)
2014	Tom Stafford (26)	Aimee Legault (7)
2013	Mike Kozlowski (21)	Kirsten Bodashefsky (12)
2012	Darren Roffey (20)	Emma Dickinson (17)
2011	Ryan Gregory (17)	
2010	Corey Bowen (19)	
2009	Darren Roffey (17)	
2008	Darren Roffey (21)	

	(Men's) Keane's Coach's Award	(Women's) Coach's Award
2024	Mathew Makin	Charlotte Biot
2023	Tristan Picketts	Evaline Harmsen
2022	Paul Barron	Filssan Houssein
2019	Soman Panigrahi	Michelle Huard
2018	Greg Bridges	Michelle Huard
2017	Greg Bridges	Harmony Sluiman
2016	Greg Bridges	Holly Vachon
2015	Michael Beall	Lisa Dalla Rosa
2014	Joel Crimmins	Brier Dodge
2013	Jack Beardmore/Andrew Wilson	Emma Dickinson
2012	Charles Bernard	Meghan Haycock
2011	David Martin	
2010	Jay Goldhawk	
2009	Zac Plunkett-Latimer	
2008	Seth Potter	

	(Men's) Players Player	(Women's) Players Player
2024	Olivier Trembley	Evaline Harmsen
2023	Not Awarded	Not Awarded
2022	Greg Bridges	Charlotte Biot

	Volunteer of the Year Award
2024	Connor Adair & Evaline Harmsen
2023	Brendan Boucher
2022	Yaser Abou Elenein
2019	Rob Harbic
2018	Pablo Juarez & Michelle Huard
2017	Amanda Paradis
2016	Lisa Dalla Rosa
2015	Alp Oran
2014	Charles Bernard
2013	Alp Oran
2012	Rob Paradis
2011	Benjamin Birt
2010	
2009	Rob Duncan
2008	Tammy Bowen & Lisa Dalla Rosa

== League awards ==
Grand Final Best and Fairest

- 2024 Lannie Richardson (AFLO)
- 2018 Pat Eefting (AFLO)
- 2016 Belinda Wozniak (AFLQ)
- 2015 Ash Scott (AFLQ)

Best and Fairest

- 2025 Isabel Kleinbub (AFLO - Women's+)
- 2024 Filssan Houssein (AFLO - Women's+)
- 2022 Jordan Harcombe (AFLO - Men's)
- 2019 Cory Townder (AFLO - Men's)
- 2016 Belinda Wozniak (AFLQ - Women's)
- 2014 Tom Stafford (AFLO - Men's)

Leading Goalkicker

- 2025 Abby McDonald (AFLO - Women's+)
- 2025 Jordan Harcombe (AFLO - Men's)
- 2024 Amanda Irwin (AFLO - Women's+)
- 2016 Belinda Wozniak (AFLQ - Women's)

Canadian Best and Fairest

- 2023 Riley Turpin (AFLO - Men's)
- 2018 Jordan Harcombe (AFLO - Men's)
- 2015 Nathan Strom (AFLO - Men's)

Most Improved Player

- 2016 Dora Bartulovic (AFLQ - Women's)

Rookie Of The Year

- 2024 Lannie Richardson (AFLO - Women's+)
- 2018 Brent Williams (AFLO - Men's)
- 2016 Belinda Wozniak (AFLQ - Women's)
- 2012 Emma Dickinson (AFLO - Women's)
- 2008 Ryan Gregory (AFLO - Men's)

Coach Of The Year

- 2025 Yaser Abou Elenein (AFLO - Women's+)
- 2019 Nathan Strom (AFLO - Men's)
- 2019 Greg Simpson (AFLO - Women's)
- 2018 Matthew Powell (AFLO - Men's)

(Men's) OAFL All-Star Team

- 2025 James Clock, Jordan Harcombe, Geoff Coventry, Corey Herrington
- 2024 Ben Stanzel, Mathew Makin
- 2023 James Clock (Wing), Riley Turpin (Wing)
- 2022 Corey Herrington (CHB), Greg Bridges (HBF), James Clock (Wing), Geoff Coventry (HFF), Jordan Harcombe (FF), Michael Masek (I/C), Greg Bridges (assistant coach)
- 2019 John O'Connor, Cory Townder, Cameron Brown (VC), Greg Bridges, Mic Masek, Nathan Strom (coach)
- 2018 Jordan Harcombe, Alex Huard, Cameron Ralph, Cameron Brown, Mic Masek, Morgan Whyte, Nathan Strom, Matthew Powell (coach)
- 2017 Nathan Strom (Captain - HF), Jordan Harcombe (R), Ronan Shaughnessy (Bench), Morgan Whyte (Back), Matthew Powell (assistant coach)
- 2016 Nathan Strom (VC), Alex Huard (I/C), Morgan Whyte (Ruck), Ronan Shaughnessy (midfield), Blair Oliver (HF), Rod Frank (assistant coach)
- 2015 Nathan Strom (VC) (HFF), Jordan Harcombe, Ronan Shaughnessy
- 2014 Nathan Strom, Mike Kowzlowski, Ronan Shaughnessy, Tom Stafford, Rod Frank (assistant coach)
- 2013 Mike Kowzlowski (HF), Nathan Strom (Wing), Ronan Shaughnessy (I/C) Rod Frank (assistant coach)
- 2012 Mike Kozlowski (CHB)
- 2011 Chris Peck (Bench)
- 2008 Ryan Gregory (Bench)

(Men's) OAFL Canadian All-Ontario Team

- 2017 Nathan Strom (Captain - HF), Jordan Harcombe (R), Ronan Shaughnessy (HB), Morgan Whyte (HB), Matthew Powell (assistant coach)

(Women's+) OAFL/AFLQ All-Star Team

- 2025 Evaline Harmsen, Alanna Richardsn, Caroline Leduc, Filssan Houssein, Ricki-Lee Bloom, Abigail McDonald, Yaser Abou Elenein
- 2024 Charlotte Biot, Lannie Richardson, Amanda Irwin, FIlssan Houssein, Isabel Kleinbub (I/C), Yaser Abou Elenein (assistant coach)
- 2023 Charlotte Biot (Captain, CHB), Filssan Houssein (Centre), Caroline Leduc (HFF), Briana Fayad (FP), Evaline Harmsen (I/C), Isabel Kleinbub (I/C), Yaser Abou Elenein (assistant coach)
- 2022 Caroline Leduc (HFF), Charlotte Biot (I/C) Evaline Harmsen (I/C), Yaser Abou Elenein (assistant coach)
- 2019 Michelle Huard (VC), Margret Wernuik, Holly Vachon, Amanda Smith, Harmony Sluiman, Charlotte Biot, Greg Simpson (coach)
- 2018 Michelle Huard, Vivian Nguyen, Holly Vachon, Rebecca Rousseau, Margret Wernuik, Erica Sabbath, Greg Simpson (coach)
- 2017 Margret Wernuik, Courtney Diotte, Roberta Kramchynsky, Anke Patzelt, Krystal Novak (AFLQ)
- 2016 Margret Wernuik, Vivian Nguyen, Holly Vachon, Rebecca Gomez, Beth Sheffield, Dora Bartulovic, Belinda Wozniak (AFLQ)
- 2015 Margaret Wernuik, Catherine Geci, Kelly Cambridge, Holly Vachon, Dora Bartulovic, Laurea Stoot, Vivian Nguyen (AFLQ)
- 2014 Margo Legault, Emma Dickinson, Holly Vachon, Amiee Legault, Vivian Nguyen, Chris Lockhart (coach)
- 2013 Kirsten Bodashefsky (Rover), Emma Dickinson (Centre), Holly Vachon(HF)

Northwind (National Canadian Team) Players

- 2024 Greg Bridges, Greg Layman, Geoffrey Coventry, Morgan Whyte
- 2022 Jordan Harcombe, James Clock, Riley Joseph, Geoff Coventry, Michael Masek, Greg Bridges
- 2017 Morgan Whyte, Alex Huard, Greg Bridges, Kyle Graham
- 2014 Nathan Strom, Mike Kozlowski, Adam Nash
- 2009 Ryan Gregory, Chris Lockhart, Graeme Millen

Northern Lights (National Canadian Team) Players

- 2024 Lannie Richardson, Filssan Houssein, Caroline Leduc, Amanda Irwin, Isabel Kleinbub
- 2022 Caroline Leduc, Charlotte Biot
- 2017 Vivian Nguyen, Rebecca Gomez, Margo Legault, Aimee Legault
- 2014 Emma Dickinson, Holly Costanza, Kirsten Bodashefsky, Margo Legault, Aimee Legault

== Club Honour Board ==
Year	President	(M) Finishing position	(M) Coach	(M) Captain(s)	(M) Best & Fairest	(M) Leading Goalkicker	(W) Finishing Position	(W) Coach	(W) Captain(s)	(W) Best & Fairest	(W) Leading Goalkicker
2008	Ray Kaduck	10th	Richard Keane	Steve Spurrell	Luke Walsh	Darren Roffey (21)					
2009	Ray Kaduck	8th	Corey Bowen	Luke Walsh/Ryan Gregory (VC)	Luke Walsh	Darren Roffey (17)					
2010	Ray Kaduck	10th	Chris MacLean	Ryan Gregory/Chris Lockhart (VC)	Darren Roffey	Corey Bowen (11)					
2011	Ray Kaduck	9th	Chris MacLean	Ryan Gregory/Jay Goldhawk (VC)	Darren Roffey	Ryan Gregory (10)					
2012	Benjamin Birt/Tammy Bowen	10th	Chris MacLean/Marc Magierowicz	Darren Roffey/Jay Goldhawk (VC)/Mike Kozlowski (VC)	Darren Roffey	Darren Roffey (20)	2nd	Chris Lockhart	Lisa Dalla Rosa	Emma Dickinson	Emma Dickinson
2013	Chris MacLean	5th	Rod Frank	Mike Kozlowski/Jay Goldhawk (VC)	Nathan Strom	Mike Kozlowski (21)	4th	Chris Lockhart	Lisa Dalla Rosa	Emma Dickinson	Kirsten Bodashefsky
2014	Chris MacLean	3rd	Rod Frank	Mike Kozlowski/Nathan Strom (VC)	Tom Stafford	Tom Stafford (26)	1st	Chris Lockhart	Holly Costanza	Aimee Legault	
2015	Chris MacLean		Rod Frank	Nathan Strom	Nathan Strom	Matthew Powell & Nathan Strom		Chris Lockhart	Holly Costanza	Holly Costanza	
2016	Chris MacLean		Rod Frank	Nathan Strom	Alex Huard, Blair Oliver, Nathan Strom	Matthew Powell (31)		Chris Lockhart	Holly Costanza	Vivian Nguyen	Belinda Wozniak
2017	Chris MacLean		Matthew Powell		Nathan Strom	Matthew Powell		Charles Bernard		Anke Patzelt	Amanda Paradis & Holly Vachon
2018	Trevor Jamieson	1st	Matthew Powell	Jono Burnett	Cameron Ralph	Jordan Hardcombe (31)	2nd	Greg Simpson	Amanda Paradis	Vivian Nguyen	Krystal Novak (15)
2019	Yaser Abou Elenein	1st	Nathan Strom	John O'Connor	Cory Townder	Cory Townder (31)	2nd	Greg Simpson	Amanda Paradis	Holly Vachon	
2020	Yaser Abou Elenein	Season Cancelled due to Covid	Cam Brown	John O'Connor	N/A	N/A	Season Cancelled due to Covid	Michelle Huard	Amanda Paradis	N/A	N/A
2021	Yaser Abou Elenein	Season Cancelled due to Covid	Dwayne Cocks/Greg Bridges		N/A	N/A	Season Cancelled due to Covid	Michelle Huard		N/A	N/A
2022	Yaser Abou Elenein	3rd	Greg Bridges	Jordan Harcombe	Jordan Harcombe	Jordan Harcombe	4th	Yaser Abou Elenein	Charlotte Biot/Carole Leduc	Charlotte Biot	Caroline Leduc
2023	Yaser Abou Elenein	6th	Jordan Harcombe/Brendan Boucher/Joshua LaPorta	James Clock	James Clock	Geoffrey Coventry	4th	Yaser Abou Elenein	Charlotte Biot/Carole Leduc	Caroline Leduc	Caroline Leduc
2024	Rob Harbic	4th	Jonny Kay/James Clock	Andrew MacDonald	Ben Stanzel	Geoffrey Coventry	1st	Yaser Abou Elenein	Charlotte Biot	Lannie Richardson	Amanda Irwin
2025	Rob Harbic	3rd	James Clock/Joshua LaPorta	Andrew MacDonald	Corey Herrington	Jordan Harcombe	1st	Yaser Abou Elenein	Fee Houssein	Lannie Richardson	Abby McDonald
