= AFL Canada =

Australian rules football governing body

- Sport: Australian rules football
- Jurisdiction: Canada
- Founded: 30 July 2004
- Headquarters: Toronto, Ontario, Canada
- President: Lachlan Griffiths
- Replaced: Canadian Australian Football Association

Official website
- www.aflcanada.com
- (Canada)

AFL Canada (formerly the Canadian Australian Football Association, French: Association canadienne de football australien) is the governing body for men's and women's Australian rules football in Canada.

AFL Canada was formed on 30 July 2004, when the Canadian Australian Football Association changed its official name.

AFL Canada is responsible for co-ordinating three national programs - the Northwind senior men, Northern Lights senior women and the Wolfpack junior men's team. AFL Canada also oversees game development nationally and several competitions and tournaments across the country.

== History ==
The Canadian Australian Football Association was established in May 1989 when two clubs, the Mississauga Mustangs (now the High Park Demons) and the Toronto Panthers (now the Toronto Eagles), were formed and played in the inaugural Conacher Cup game in Toronto, Ontario.

== National teams ==
AFL Canada selects the Northwind, Canada's national men's Australian rules football team, and the Northern Lights, Canada's national women's team. Northwind and Northern Lights players are selected from the best Canadian-born players from the clubs across the country, with both teams playing in international tournaments and exhibition matches.

The Northwind have competed at every edition of the triennial Australian Football International Cup, at which they have finished as high as fifth.

The Northern Lights have competed at all three editions of the women's tournament, making every final of the International Cup and winning the tournament in 2014.

Both national teams also compete against the United States at the 49th Parallel Cup, with the Northern Lights undefeated since 2012.

AFL Canada has also put forward the Wolfpack, a junior men's team, which has played games in Australia.

== Australian Football International Cup ==
The Northwind have competed at the Australian Football International Cup since their first appearance in 2002. The International Cup is a competition where players that are citizens of the countries who are competing are the only players allowed to play (no expatriate Australians are permitted to play, with teams composed solely of amateurs who must be nationals of the country they represent).

In the 2002 Australian Football International Cup the Canada Northwind finished 9th of 11 teams.
Round 1: Ireland 7.14 (56) def. Canada 4.7 (31) - Trevor Barker Beach Oval, Sandringham, Melbourne
Round 2: Canada 4.11 (38) def. South Africa 1.5 (11)
Round 3: New Zealand 10.8 (68) def. Canada 2.6 (18)
Round 4: USA 8.4 (52) def. Canada 1.1 (7)
Round 5: Samoa 9.15 (69) def. Canada 0.5 (5)
9th/10th Place Playoff: Canada 6.5 (41) def. Japan 5.2 (32)

In the 2005 Australian Football International Cup the Northwind finished 7th of 10 teams.
Round 1: Ireland 4.7 (31) def. Canada 3.5 (23)
Round 2: Papua New Guinea 5.11 (41) def. Canada 4.3 (27)
Round 3: Samoa 7.4 (46) def. Canada 6.6 (42)
Round 4: Great Britain 3.7 (25) def. 3.5 Canada (23)
Qualifying Final: Canada def. Spain (Spain forfeited).
7th/8th Place Playoff: Canada 4.5 (29) def. South Africa 2.6 (18)

In the 2008 Australian Football International Cup the Northwind finished 6th of 16 teams:
Round 1: Canada Northwind 18.22 (130) def. Finland Icebreakers 0.0 (0) - Western Oval
Round 2: Canada Northwind 16.12 (108) def. Sweden Elks 1.1 (7) - Ransford Oval
Round 3: Ireland Warriors 4.6 (30) def. Canada Northwind 2.2 (14) - Reid Oval
Finals Round 1: Canada Northwind 7.7 (49) def. Japan Samurais 0.3 (3) - Walter Oval
5th/6th Place Playoff: Nauru Chiefs 12.8 (80) def. Canada Northwind 7.7 (49) - Ransford Oval

In the 2011 Australian Football International Cup the Northwind finished 10th of 18 teams
Group 6 - Match 1: Canada 2.0 (12) def. by United States 2.3 (15) - Blacktown International Sportspark 2
Group 6 - Match 2: Canada 3.6 (24) def. Peres Team for Peace 0.0 (0) - Blacktown International Sportspark 2
Division 1 - Group 1 - Match 1: Canada 2.3 (15) def. by Great Britain 6.8 (44) - Blacktown International Sportspark 2
Division 1 - Group 1 - Match 3: Canada 3.2 (20) def. by New Zealand 5.9 (39) - Blacktown International Sportspark 1
Division 1 Semi-finals: Canada 13.8 (86) def. Japan 2.1 (13) - McAllister Oval
9th/10th Place Playoff: Canada 6.4 (40) def. by Tonga 6.10 (46) - Ransford Oval

In the 2014 Australian Football International Cup the Northwind finished 5th of 18 teams.
Pool C - Round 1: Canada 19.5 (119) def. China 0.1 (1) - McAlister Oval
Pool C - Round 2: Canada 2.8 (20) def. by USA 8.3 (51) - Ransford Oval
Pool C - Round 3: Canada 20.10 (130) def. Sweden 0.0 (0) - Ben Kavanagh Reserve
Division 1 Semi-finals: Canada 9.15 (69) def. France 2.3 (15) - Ransford Oval
Division 1 Championship (5th/6th Place Playoff): Canada 9.7 (61) def. Tonga 7.6 (48) - McAlister Oval

== See also ==
- Australian rules football in Canada
- Countries playing Australian rules football
