= Toronto Eagles =

Toronto Eagles may refer to:

- Toronto Eagles (Australian rules football), Canadian Australian rules football club competing in the AFL Ontario.
- Toronto Eagles (soccer) Canadian soccer team, now known as SC Toronto
- UTM Eagles, the intramural sports teams of the University of Toronto Mississauga
