= AFL Quebec =

Australian rules football competition in Canada

- Sport: Australian Football
- Founded: 2008
- No. of teams: 8
- Country: Canada
- Most recent champion: Old Montreal Dockers
- Website: http://www.aflquebec.ca/

AFL Quebec is a 9-a-side Australian football competition formerly known as the Eastern Canadian Australian Football League or ECAFL. The league has both a men's and women's division and consists of teams from Montréal and its surrounding areas. Players from the current regular season teams are eligible to play representative 18-a-side football for the men's team the Québec Saints or the women's team the Montréal Angels. The Saints and Angels participate in the United States AFL National Championships Tournament, the Saints having previously participated in the AFL Ontario Division 2 competition from 2008 to 2010.

== History ==
=== Formation years: 2008–2010 ===
The creation of the Québec Saints in early 2008 and their participation in the Toronto-based 'Rec' Footy league that same year led to a growing interest in Australian Football in Montréal. To capitalise on the popularity, club founder Luke Anderson launched a locally based 9-a-side competition named the Eastern Canadian Australian Football League or ECAFL. The 9-a-side format of the game is played on reduced size fields (usually rugby or soccer fields). Players from the Québec Saints were drafted into two subsidiary teams, the first match of the newly formed league was played on 4 October 2008 between the Montréal Saints and Laval Bombers at Parc Cartier in Laval.

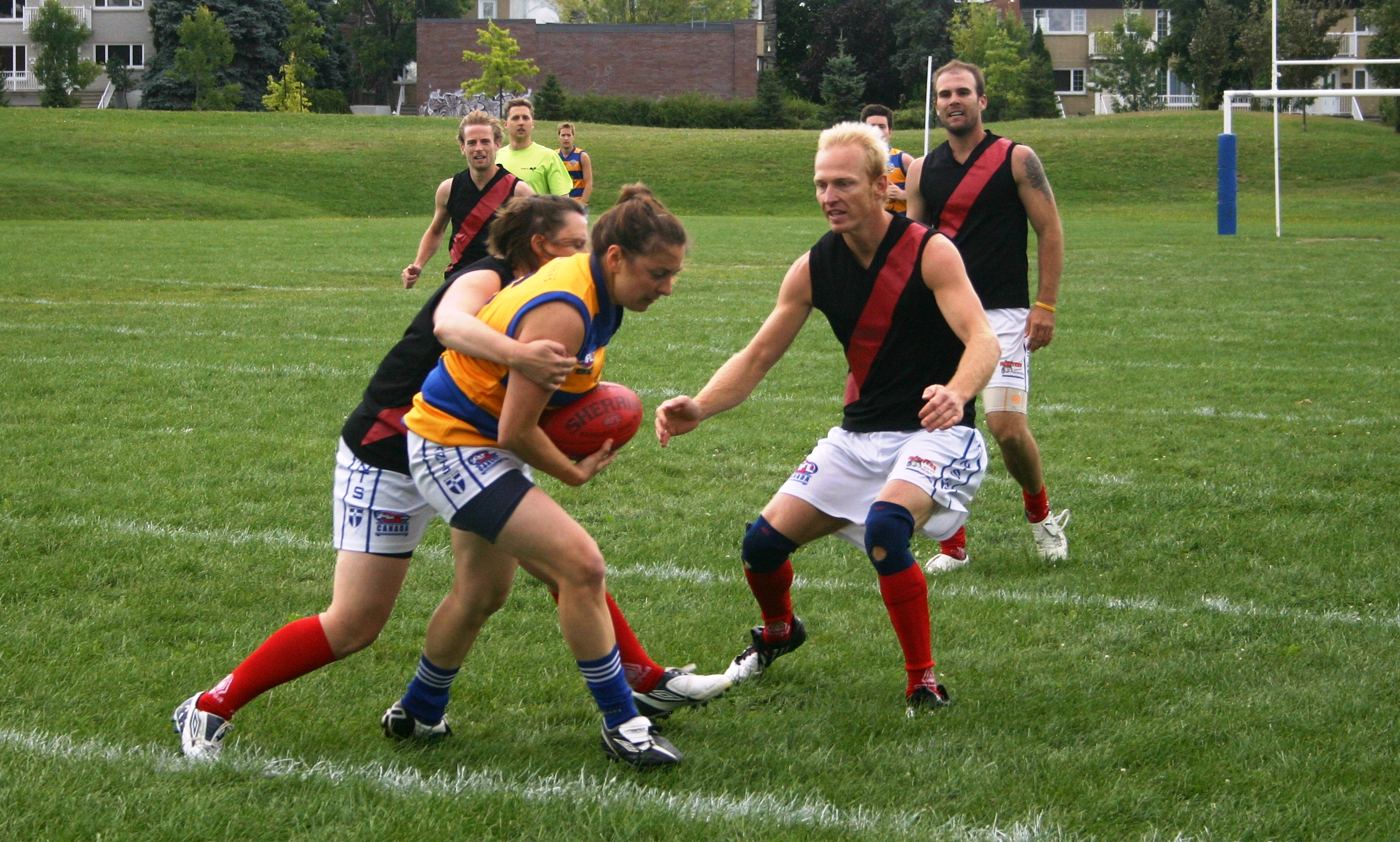
Dani Anderson tackles Margo Legault - Pointe Claire Power and the Laval Bombers face off in the 2010 ECAFL Grand Final

2009 saw the league schedule seven regular season games and one final and launch the introduction of an invitational Pre-Season tournament. The league also introduced women's football for the first time. The newly formed Montréal Angels (a branch of the Québec Saints), played exhibition games against the Toronto Central Blues and Montréal Shamrocks Gaelic Football team. Players from the 9-a-side competition where eligible to play representative football for the Québec Saints who were competing in the Ontario AFL Division 2.

With increasing player numbers, the 2010 season saw the launch of a third Montréal based team, the Pointe Claire Power. The invitational pre-season cup was contested by a record six teams and for the first time included a women's division. The league established a home field at Parc Cluny in Laval. The season was reduced to five rounds to accommodate the Québec Saints Ontario AFL schedule, the representative 18-a-side team's fixture featuring a marked increase in games in Ottawa and Toronto.

=== Transition year: 2011 ===
Club and league founder Luke Anderson departed Montréal in late 2010 and the newly formed committee under the leadership of new president Renaud Carbonell made several changes to the league's structure. Major changes included the Québec Saints withdrawing from the Ontario AFL's Division 2 competition and AFL Québec returning to the original two teams with the folding of the 2010 premiers the Pointe Claire Power. While player participation experienced a drop-off in 2011, Montréal still had a significant football presence with a host of players and coaches participating in 'IC11', the International Cup of Australian Football co-hosted by Melbourne and Sydney, Australia.

=== Expansion era: 2012–2017 ===
2012 saw a resurgence of Australian Football. The league was rebranded 'AFL Quebec' and expanded to four teams (The Laval Bombers, Melbourne Demons, Fremantle Dockers and West Coast Eagles) - three of which had official backing from AFL teams, thanks to the initiative of William T. - and Montreal would be represented at the U.S. Nationals football tournament for the first time, albeit as a combine team. The growing interest in Aussie Rules would continue for the next few years before the league officially announced the creation of a women's division for 2014 with the creation of the N.D.G. Giants and Plateau Eagles.

In 2015 the women's league expanded to four teams when Ottawa entered the Carleton Warriors and the Rideau Shamrocks into the competition.

== AFL Quebec Premiers ==
Year	Men's Premiers	Men's runner-up	Women's Premiers	Women's runner-up	Pre-season champions	Women's Tournament champions
2008	Laval Bombers	Montréal Saints	N/A	N/A	N/A	N/A
2009	Laval Bombers	Montréal Saints	N/A	N/A	Ottawa Swans	N/A
2010	Pointe Claire Power	Laval Bombers	N/A	N/A	Ottawa Swans	Montréal Angels
2011	Laval Bombers	Montréal Saints	N/A	N/A	Ottawa Swans	N/A
2012	Laval Bombers	Old Montréal Dockers	N/A	N/A	West Island Eagles	Montréal Angels
2013	Laval Bombers	West Island Eagles	N/A	N/A	Ottawa Swans	Ottawa Lady Swans
2014	West Island Wooders	Laval Bombers	N.D.G. Devils	Plateau Eagles	Quebec Saints	Montréal Angels
2015	West Island Wooders	Montréal Demons	Carleton Warriors	Rideau Shamrocks	Québec Saints	New York Lady Magpies
2016	Montréal Demons	West Island Wooders	Carleton Warriors	N.D.G. Giants	Ottawa Swans (M & W)	Montréal Angels
2017	Montréal Demons	West Island Wooders	Plateau Eagles	N.D.G. Giants	Quebec Saints / Montreal Angels	Montréal Angels
2018	Old Montréal Dockers	Montréal Demons	Plateau Eagles	Montréal City Bluebelles	Quebec Saints	Ontario Demons
2019	Montréal Demons	West Island Wooders	N/A	N/A	N/A	New York Lady Magpies
2021	Montreal City Blues	XXXX	N/A	N/A	XXXX (M) / Ottawa Swans (W)	N/A
2022	Montreal City Blues	XXXX	N/A	N/A	XXXX / Quebec Saints (W)	Quebec Saints (W)
2023	Montreal City Blues	Old Montreal Dockers	N.D.G. Giants	Montreal City Blues	Quebec Saints (M) / Ottawa Swans (W)	Quebec Saints (W)
2024	Old Montréal Dockers	Montréal Demons	Montreal City Blues	N.D.G. Giants	Quebec Saints (M) / Quebec Saints (W)	Quebec Saints (W)
2025	Montréal Demons	Old Montréal Dockers	NDG Giants	Montreal City Blues	Ottawa Swans (M) / Quebec Saints (W)	High Park Demons (W)

== AFL Quebec individual awards ==
Year	League MVP (Men)	League MVP (Women)	Leading Goalkicker (Men)	Leading Goalkicker (Women)
2008	D.Barker (Bombers)/J.Lavoie (Saints)	N/A	Jeff Lavoie - Saints (5)	N/A
2009	Cam Stark (Bombers)	Aimee Legault (Angels)	Cam Stark - Bombers (28)	N/A
2010	D.Haverhoek (Bombers)/S.Heath (Saints)	Aimee Legault (Angels)	Cam Beaman - Power (19)	N/A
2011	Paul Fairbrother (Bombers)	N/A	Christopher Micheletti - Saints (22)	N/A
2012	Ronan Shaughnessy (Dockers)	N/A	Paul Fairbrother - Bombers (22)	N/A
2013	Bogdan Rotaru (Bombers)	Margo Legault (Angels & Eagles)	Toby Campaign - Dockers (27)	N/A
2014	Phil Manassa (Wooders)	Elaine Gilmore (Eagles)	Fabio Petosa - Wooders (36)	Aimee Legault - Giants (24)
2015	Daniel Robinson (Wooders)	Valérie Moreau (Giants)	Todd Rogers - Bombers (37)	Valérie Moreau - Giants (27)
2016	Morgan Whyte (Demons)	Valérie Moreau (Giants)	Fabio Petosa - Wooders	Belinda Wozniak - Warriors
2017	Phil Manassa (Wooders)	Aimee Legault (Eagles)	Simon Auger - Bombers	Aimee Legault - Eagles (9)
2018	Pat Eefting (Blues)	Roxanne Besner (Bluebelles)	Pat Eefting - Blues (31)	Dale Bradley - Eagles (10)
2019	Alex Bresse (Demons)	Aimee Legault (Giants)	Kyle Graham - Demons (30)	Aimee Legault - Giants (20)
2021	Yacine Baouche (Blues)	Isabelle Senécal (N/A)	N/A	N/A
2022	Nick Curtis (Blues)	Iliana Loupessis (N/A)	Bogdan Rotaru - Blues (XX)	N/A
2023	Phil Manassa (Blues) & Bogdan Rotaru (Dockers)	Caroline Leduc (Blues)	Bogdan Rotaru - Blues (15)	Caroline Leduc - Blues (11)
2024	Morgan Whyte (Demons)	Caroline Leduc (Blues)	Bradley Allen - Blues (15)	Caroline Leduc - Blues (19)
2025	Morgan Whyte (Demons)	Larissa Andrusyshyn (Blues)	Bradley Allen - Blues (15)	Caroline Leduc - Blues (22)

== Current AFL Quebec teams ==
=== Men's teams ===
Club	Colours	Nickname	City	Est.	Years in QAFL	Premierships	
Club	Colours	Nickname	City	Est.	Years in QAFL	Total	Years
Montréal		Demons	Montréal	2018	2012-	4	2016, 2017, 2019, 2025
Montréal City		Blues	Montréal	2018	2018-	3	2021, 2022, 2023
Old Montréal		Dockers	Montréal	2012	2012-	2	2018, 2024

=== Women's teams ===
Club	Colours	Nickname	City	Est.	Years in QAFL	Premierships	
Club	Colours	Nickname	City	Est.	Years in QAFL	Total	Years
Notre-Dame-de-Grace (N.D.G)		Giants	Montréal	2014	2014-	2	2014, 2023, 2025
Montréal City		Blues	Montréal	2018	2018-	1	2024

== Former clubs ==
=== Men's clubs ===
Club	Colours	Nickname	City	Est.	Years in QAFL	Premierships		
Club	Colours	Nickname	City	Est.	Years in QAFL	Total	Years	
Laval		Bombers	Laval	2008	2008-2018	5	2008, 2009, 2011, 2012, 2013	Folded after 2018 season
Montréal		Saints	Montréal	2008	2008-2011	0	-	Folded after 2011 season
Pointe Claire		Power	Pointe Claire	2009	2009-2010	1	2010	Folded after 2010 season
West Island Wooders		Wooders (formerly Eagles)	Sainte-Anne-de-Bellevue, Quebec	2012	2012-2019 & 2024	2	2014, 2015	In recess since 2024 season

=== Women's clubs ===
Club	Colours	Nickname	City	Est.	Years in QAFL	Premierships		Fate
Club	Colours	Nickname	City	Est.	Years in QAFL	Total	Years	Fate
Carleton Warriors		Warriors	Ottawa	2015	2015-2016	2	2015, 2016	Folded after 2016 season
Ottawa Lady Swans		Lady Swans	Ottawa	2007	2017	0	-	Folded after 2017 season
Plateau Eagles		Eagles	Montréal	2014	2014-2019	2	2017, 2018	Folded after 2019 season
Rideau Shamrocks		Shamrocks	Ottawa	2015	2015-2016	0	-	Folded after 2016 season
