= Amateur sport in Toronto =

Amateur sport in Toronto has a vibrant and distinguished history, with a breadth of sports featuring significant participation in youth leagues, collegiate sports, and other organised and ad hoc events.

== Basketball ==
Toronto youth basketball has the greatest participation amongst high school programs in the Greater Toronto Area, and is often considered the fastest growing sport at the Toronto high school level.

== Soccer ==
There are many parks throughout Toronto where pickup soccer games are played, including Trinity Bellwoods, Christie Pits and the Cherry Beach Sports Fields. There are also private organized leagues and the OpenSports app, which many individuals organize pickup soccer games on.

== Ice hockey ==
Toronto youth ice hockey teams participate in the world's largest organised ice hockey league, the Greater Toronto Hockey League, founded in 1911 in The Beaches neighbourhood. Toronto's elementary and secondary schools also play for a Toronto title.

== Football ==
Toronto was for many years the host of the annual Vanier Cup football championship, and also hosted (and won) many of the early Grey Cup competitions that were contested by amateur football teams. Both championship games were once again held in Toronto in 2007, along with the annual Metro Bowl high school championship.

Toronto was also host to a series of NCAA football bowl games called the International Bowl between 2007-2010.

== Water sports ==
Toronto's Argonaut Rowing Club, founded in 1872, is one of Canada and North America's oldest rowing clubs. The rowing club also sponsored the football club that became today's Toronto Argonauts.

== Roller Derby ==
Women's Flat track roller derby has been gaining popularity across the region in recent years, with two full-contact leagues operating within the city of Toronto. Toronto Roller Derby (ToRD), one of the larger leagues in Canada in terms of membership, operates out of The Bunker at Downsview Park, hosting games from most of the year. Hogtown Roller Derby is a smaller league which operates out of Ted Reeve Arena in the east end of the city. Both leagues are full members of the Women's Flat Track Derby Association, the largest governing body for women's roller derby in the world, with ToRD gaining membership in 2011, and GTAR in 2013.

== Rugby League ==
Rugby league in Canada was relaunched in 2010. The governing body of the sport Canada Rugby League has taken major steps to develop the sport at the domestic and international level. The province of Ontario now has 4 teams who compete in the domestic season. The Canada national rugby league team also known as 'The Wolverines', has come off a very successful season in 2011, recording victories against Jamaica and the United States, the qualifying nation of the 2013 RLWC. The match against the United States aired live on CBC as part of Spots Day in Canada, proving the rapidly growing fan base erupting in the commonwealth nation of Canada. British Columbia is also showing signs of developments with a domestic and university bodies developing in the Western part of Canada.

== Ultimate (disc) ==
The Toronto Ultimate Club (TUC) is a not-for-profit organization that officially began in 1980 and incorporated in 1995. TUC has 3300 members and 250 teams playing every season on most days of the week, on various fields (indoor and outdoor) throughout the year. The Club consists of three full-time managers, a strong Board of Directors who represent the membership, and over 100 volunteers who make the TUC successful.

== Collegiate sports ==
=== Universities ===
- Ontario Tech Ridgebacks
- Ryerson Rams
- Varsity Blues
- York Lions

=== Community colleges ===
- Seneca Sting
- Humber Hawks
- George Brown Huskies
- Centennial Colts

== Events ==
There have been some proponents for the city to host the Summer Olympics. With city council's endorsement, bids were submitted to the International Olympic Committee to host the 1996 Olympics, eventually awarded to Atlanta, and the 2008 Olympics, awarded to Beijing.

With Canada's selection as host for the 2007 FIFA U-20 World Cup, Toronto was established as the venue for the final and third-place matches, hosting twelve games in total.

Every January from 2007 to 2010, the city hosted the International Bowl, an NCAA college football bowl game. The inaugural match was contested between the University of Cincinnati and Western Michigan University.

The city also features ad hoc events like the Toronto Donut Ride, an informal weekly road cycling tour that also covers parts of York Region.

On November 9, 2009, Toronto was announced as the host city for the 2015 Pan American Games.

== See also ==
- Toronto sports
- List of sports teams in Toronto
- Etobicoke Olympium
- Ken Westerfield (history of disc sports in Canada)
- Ultimate Canada
