= 49th Parallel Cup =

- Sport: Australian rules football
- Founded: 1999
- First season: 1999
- No. of teams: 2
- Country: United States; Canada
- Continent: North America
- Most recent champion: Canada (2nd title) (2026)
- Most titles: United States (9th title)
- Broadcasters: CBC Sports, YouTube

The 49th Parallel Cup (formerly PanAm Cup) is an annual representative Australian rules football match between the United States and Canada first contested in 1999. Since 2007 the women's teams have also contested the cup.

The men's matches are contested between the United States men's team ("The Revolution") and Canada's men's team ("The Northwind") while the women's matches are contested between the United States women's team ("The Freedom") and Canada's women's team ("The Northern Lights").

The cup is historically paused during the Australian Football International Cup year to enable the countries to compete at that tournament. Between 2015 and 2021 the cup went into recess for several reasons, primarily due to the 2017 Australian Football International Cup followed by the COVID-19 pandemic.

== Men's results ==
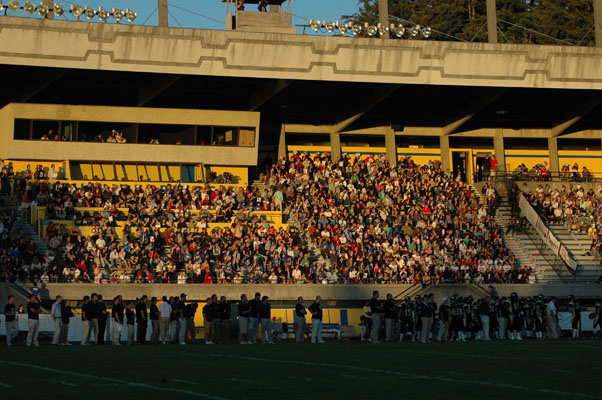
Thunderbird Stadium Vancouver, home to the 2007 Cup, holds the all-time attendance record for the event

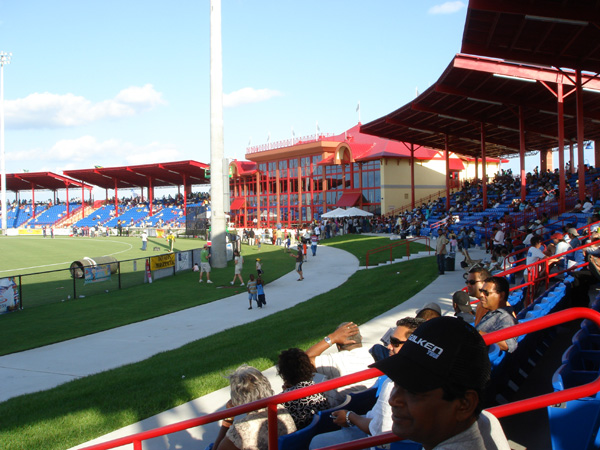
CBRP Stadium in Florida was the venue for the 2015 Cup

49th Parallel Cup Men's Results
	Year	Date	Home team	Score	Away team	Score	Venue	Winner	Media
1	1999		United States	10.15 (75)	Canada	8.7 (55)	Chicago, Illinois	USA by 20	
2	2000		Canada	2.4 (16)	United States	4.17 (41)	Toronto, Ontario	USA by 25	
3	2003	2 August	United States	9.12 (66)	Canada	9.10 (64)	Pittsburgh, Pennsylvania	USA by 2	
4	2004		Canada	7.9 (51)	United States	9.9 (63)	Toronto, Ontario	USA by 12	
5	2007	4 August	Canada	6.9 (45)	(United States) USA	4.8 (32)	Thunderbird Stadium, Vancouver, British Columbia	Canada by 13	
6	2009	1 August	United States	12.11 (83)	Canada	5.3 (33)	Heritage Oak Park, Mason, Ohio	USA by 50	
7	2010	31 July	Canada	5.2 (32)	United States	9.12 (66)	Humber College, Toronto, Ontario	USA by 34	
8	2012	4 August	United States	7.12 (54)	Canada	5.1 (31)	Darree Fields Park, Dublin, Ohio	USA by 23	
9	2013	3 August	Canada	5.6 (36)	United States	10.7 (67)	Kaskitayo Park, Edmonton, Alberta	USA by 34	Video on YouTube
10	2015	1 August	United States	6.9 (45)	Canada	3.11 (29)	CBRP Stadium, Lauderhill, Florida	USA by 16	Video on YouTube
11	2022	13 August	Canada	6.3 (39)	United States	7.7 (49)	Colonel Samuel Smith Park (Humber College cricket oval), Toronto, Ontario	USA by 10	Video on YouTube
12	2023	5 August	United States	5.9 (39)	Canada	5.6 (36)	Soccer Complex of Racine (SCORe) Racine, Wisconsin	USA by 3	Video on YouTube
13	2026	29 August	Canada	6.4 (40)	United States	4.2 (26)	Rutland Recreation Park Kelowna, British Columbia	Canada by 14	

== Women's results ==
49th Parallel Cup Women's Results
	Year	Date	Home team	Score	Away team	Score	Venue	Winner	Media
1	2007	4 August	Canada	0.0 (0)	United States	14.13 (97)	Thunderbird Stadium, Vancouver, British Columbia	USA by 97	
2	2009	1 August	United States	2.4 (16)	Canada	4.12 (26)	Heritage Oak Park, Mason, Ohio	Canada by 10	
3	2010	31 July	Canada	4.12 (36)	United States	2.4 (22)	Humber College, Toronto, Ontario	Canada by 14	Video on YouTube
4	2012	4 August	United States	6.7 (43)	Canada	5.8 (38)	Darree Fields Park, Dublin, Ohio	USA by 5	
5	2013	3 August	Canada	13.8 (86)	United States	0.1 (1)	Kaskitayo Park, Edmonton, Alberta	Canada by 85	
6	2015	1 August	United States	5.3 (33)	Canada	11.6 (72)	CBRP Stadium, Lauderhill, Florida	Canada by 39	Video on YouTube
7	2023	19 August	United States	1.9 (15)	Canada	3.6 (24)	Soccer Complex of Racine (SCORe) Racine, Wisconsin	Canada by 9	Video on YouTube
