= Toronto Rebels =

Australian rules football club in Canada

Toronto Rebels AFC
- Full name: Toronto Rebels Australian Football Club
- Nickname: The Rebels
- Sport: Australian rules football
- Founded: 1990
- League: AFL Ontario
- Home ground: Humber South, Etobicoke
- President: Jack Wynne
- Head coach: Sam McPartlan
- Captain: Rob Tersigni

Strip
- Black and White (based on the design of the Collingwood Magpies Australian Football Club)

The Toronto Rebels Australian Football Club is an amateur Australian rules football club based in Toronto, Ontario, Canada.

Formed in 1990, the Toronto Rebels are one of the oldest and most accomplished teams in Canadian Australian Football.

== Team Highlights ==
The rebels, founded in 1990, began as Scarborough.

The team made the grand final in 1991, but was defeated by the Toronto Panthers.

The team beat Mississauga Mustangs in 1992 to win the premiership.

In 1993, the Scarborough Rebels relocated and became the Lawrence Park Rebels. That year they won a back-to-back premiership against the Panthers.

The Rebels were defeated in the 1994 Grand final by the Mustangs, ending the successive premierships.

In 1997, the team went through the season undefeated only to be defeated by the Toronto Eagles in the Grand Final.

In 1998, a repeat match saw the Eagles once again defeat the Rebels.

In 2001, the Rebels were undefeated for the entire season and went on to win the premiership.

In 2005, The Rebels lost the Grand Final to the Toronto Dingos.

In 2008, the Rebels changed their name to the Toronto Rebels.

In 2016, the Rebels won the premiership against the Ottawa Swans.

In 2017, the Rebels lost the Grand Final to the Toronto Eagles.

In 2022, The Rebels lost the Grand Final to the Hamilton Wildcats.

In 2023, the Rebels won the premiership against the Toronto Dingos.

In 2024, the Rebels won the premiership against the Toronto Dingos.

== History ==
The Rebels, founded in 1990, began as Scarborough. That year the Ontario Australian Football league doubled in size with the addition of the Scarborough Rebels and the North York Hawks. That year the Panther went undefeated and won their second straight Conacher Cup.

In 1991 the league saw the growth to the west with the creation of the Hamilton Wildcats. The Toronto Panthers won their third straight Premiership by defeating the Rebels.

1992 saw expansion again with the formation of the Balmy Beach Saints. The North York Hawks relocated and became known as the Broadview Hawks. The Scarborough Rebels defeated the Mississauga Mustangs in a thrilling match to win their first Conacher Cup.

The Brampton Wolverines, the league's seventh team, was formed in 1993. The Scarborough Rebels relocated and became the Lawrence Park Rebels. The Rebels won their second straight Premiership defeating the heavily favoured Toronto Panthers. The Panthers had been undefeated for the season.

1994 was a successful year with the Mississauga Mustangs finally winning their first Premiership. The Mustangs win over the Rebels ended their quest for a third straight Conacher Cup.

1995 was the year that the league received its greatest media coverage. Two of Toronto's dailies and local radio stations carried the league's scores and several stories. Hamilton cable covered several of the games played in Hamilton. On July 28 the Hamilton Wildcats played a CAFA All-star line up in front of 21,000 CFL fans at half time between the Hamilton Tiger cats and the Edmonton Eskimos. The Toronto Panthers were reborn as the Toronto Eagles, and they went on to be undefeated the entire year and win their fourth Premiership.

1996 saw the Downtown Dingos form, proudly wearing the Essendon colours. It is believed that 1996 was the best in CAFA history. It was the most competitive season ever with six teams fiercely contesting for four playoff spots. The season saw the seventh ranked Balmy Beach Saints upset the Toronto Eagles in a close match only to lose to the eighth ranked Brampton Wolverines the next week. The Toronto Eagles went on to win their second straight Premiership.

1997 started badly with the collapse of the Balmy Beach Saints. After many meetings to discuss the future of the league the remaining few players joined the Hawks and a few other teams. The Lawrence Park Rebels dominated the ladder that season, they went undefeated. The Toronto Eagles defeated the Lawrence Park Rebels for their third straight Conacher Cup. The Eagles came back from a four-goal deficit at the half to win by a single behind at the final siren.

1998 saw strong competition from all teams. The Rebels once more dominated the league in the early going. The Eagles came on strongly in the second half of the season. The Grand Final was a repeat match up from the previous year. The Rebels fought a hard battle against the Eagles but could not match the Eagles depth. The Eagles won their fourth straight Conacher Cup.

In 2001 the Rebels had an undefeated season and went on to win the Premiership.

In 2005 the newly renamed Lakeshore Rebels made the grand final only to lose to the Downtown Dingos.

== OAFL Premierships ==
- 1992
- 1993
- 2001
- 2016
- 2023
- 2024
- 2025
