= Canada Super60 =

- Countries: Canada
- Administrator: Cricket Canada
- Format: T10 cricket
- First edition: 2025
- Latest edition: 2026
- Next edition: 2027
- Tournament format: Round-robin and playoffs
- Number of teams: M: 6 W: 3
- Host: Canada
- Current champion: M: Toronto Sixers; W: Toronto Sixers
- Website: super60.com

The Canada Super60 is a professional T10 cricket competition played in Canada, features men's and women's tournaments using a 60-ball-per-innings format. Launched in 2025, matches are held at BC Place in Vancouver, British Columbia.

The men's competition features six city-based franchises composed of Canadian and international players. The inaugural 2025 men's championship was won by Brampton Blitz, while the Toronto Sixers Women won the women's competition. In the 2026 season, the Toronto Sixers completed a championship sweep, by winning both the men's and women's titles.

== History ==
In January 2025 the establishment of the Canada Super60 cricket competition was announced, being organized by British-based Star 333 Sports Inc., in conjunction with Cricket Canada and former Indian cricket star Yuvraj Singh. League matches are played using T10 cricket rules, with 10-over-a-side format or 60 legal deliveries, and a time duration of 90 minutes. The short-format franchise cricket competition aimed to promote cricket in North America and give local Canadian talent global exposure. The men's competition consists of a round-robin stage followed by semifinals and a final.

Ingleton Liburd was named tournament director of the new league in February 2025. In March 2025 former scotland captain Kyle Coetzer was announced as assistant tournament director.

Originally planned to be hosted at TD Cricket Arena in Brampton, in July 2025 it was announced that the tournament would instead be hosted indoors at BC Place in Vancouver, BC in October. Only seats in the lower bowl were opened. The tournament's head of media stated that this would be "probably the first high-level competitive cricket of this iteration to be played under the roof". Musical acts will perform concerts during breaks in play.

The tournament drew notable international stars, including former Indian international cricketer Yuvraj Singh, who was honored at the inaugural event in 2025 and has been associated with the promotion of the competition, and former Indian cricketer Suresh Raina who participated in the inaugural edition for the Toronto Sixers.

The intention was to make the tournament an annual event, and in March 2026 organizers announced that the second edition would again be held at BC Place from September 29 to October 4, 2026.

== Teams ==
The men's tournament features six teams, each made up of local players, international stars, and a fixed quota of players from associate nations. Two women's squads competed in a separate tournament in the inaugural season, which expanded to 3 teams in 2026.

=== Men's ===
Team	City	Debut	Captain
Toronto Sixers	Toronto, Canada	2025	Dan Christian
Montreal Royal Tigers	Montreal, Canada	2025	Shakib Al Hasan
Brampton Blitz	Brampton, Canada	2025	David Wiese
Mississagua Masters	Mississauga, Canada	2025	Imran Tahir
Vancouver Anchors	Vancouver, Canada	2026	Dwaine Pretorius
Whiterock Warriors	White Rock, Canada	2025	Chris Lynn

==== Former teams ====
- Vancouver Kings (2025)

=== Women's ===
Team	City	Captain
Toronto Sixers	Toronto, Ontario	Mady Villiers
Vancouver Anchors	Vancouver, British Columbia	Fatima Sana
Vancouver Warriors	Vancouver, British Columbia	Marizanne Kapp

== Seasons ==
=== 2025 ===
The inaugural tournament was held from 8 to 13 October 2025 at the BC Place in Vancouver, BC.The men's competition consisted of a round-robin stage followed by semifinals and a final. The women's competition featured the two teams playing a best of three matches format.

The squads were announced in September 2025, which included international players such as Shoaib Malik (Pakistan), Quinton de Kock (South Africa), Shikhar Dhawan (India) , Suresh Raina (India) and Alex Hales (England).

The Brampton Blitz won the inaugural 2025 men's tournament, defeating Montreal Royal Tigers in the final. Montreal were dismissed for 69 before Brampton reached 70 for two to win by eight wickets. The Toronto Sixers Women won two of three matches to become the inaugural women's champions.

=== 2026 ===
The second season took place at BC Place from 29 September to 4 October 2026. 24 games will be played over 6 days.

The draft for season 2 was held on July 20, 2026. Several prominent international players, including Andre Russell and Nicholas Pooran, were signed as direct pre-draft retentions.

The Vancouver team was renamed from Kings to Anchors, while the women's tournament was expanded from two to three teams.

The Toronto Sixers won the men's title, defeating the Vancouver Anchors by five wickets in the final. Team captain and coach Kieron Pollard was named Player of the Tournament. The Toronto Sixers Women won the women's title, defending their 2025 championship, and completing a sweep for the franchise.

The tournament was criticized due to the short boundaries at BC Place, which was built for football rather than cricket, with straight boundaries only 40 metres (130 ft) from the centre of the field, much shorter than the minimum Twenty20 International regulation of 195 feet (59 m). One wide delivery even bounced over the batter's and wicketkeeper's heads to sail past the boundary on the full. Edges going for sixes were indicative of the distorted balance between batting and bowling; in the final, sixes were scored from almost a third of balls in each team's innings.

==== Standings ====
===== Men's tournament =====
Team	Pld	W	L	NR	Pts	NRR	Qualification
Mississauga Masters	5	5	0	0	10	+4.583	Advanced to the Playoffs
Vancouver Kings	5	4	1	0	8	+1.193	Advanced to the Playoffs
Brampton Blitz	5	3	2	0	6	-0.790	Advanced to the Playoffs
Toronto Sixers	5	2	3	0	4	-1.576	Advanced to the Playoffs
White Rock Warriors	5	1	4	0	2	-2.531	
Montreal Royal Tigers	5	0	5	0	0	-0.963	

Source: CricTracker

===== Women's tournament =====
Team	Pld	W	L	NR	Pts	NRR	Qualification
Vancouver Warriors Women	2	2	0	0	4	+1.250	Advanced to the Final
Toronto Sixers Women	2	1	1	0	2	+0.450	Advanced to the Eliminator
Vancouver Anchors Women	2	0	2	0	0	-1.700	Advanced to the Eliminator

Source: The Sports Tak

=== Champions ===
==== Men's ====
Season	Venue	Champions	Runners-up
2025	BC Place, Vancouver	Brampton Blitz	Montreal Royal Tigers
2026	BC Place, Vancouver	Toronto Sixers	Vancouver Anchors

==== Women's ====
Season	Venue	Champions
2025	BC Place, Vancouver	Toronto Sixers Women
2026	BC Place, Vancouver	Toronto Sixers Women

== Media coverage ==
Willow TV broadcasts the games in Canada during the inaugural season. CBC announced that it had acquired the broadcast rights for the Canada Super 60 league's 2026 season, with games to be streamed on CBC Gem and select games broadcast on CBC Sports. Broadcast and digital streaming rights are distributed globally.

Region / Country	Television rights	Streaming rights
Canada & United States	CBC Sports	CBC Gem
India	United8 Sports	FanCode
Pakistan	A Sports	ARY Plus
Australia	Fox Sports	Kayo Sports (Exclusive)
Afghanistan	Moby Group	—
Bangladesh	Star Sports / Akash Digital TV	FanCode
Nepal	—	DishHome
Sri Lanka	Star Sports / Dialog TV	Sri Lanka Telecom
MENA	Dubai Sports	Awaan
United Kingdom & Continental Europe	Cricket TV Lounge	—
Rest of the World	—	SportVot (Web & App)

== See also ==
- Global T20 Canada
- Cricket Canada
