= Broadview Hawks =

Broadview
- Full name: Broadview Hawks
- Nickname: The Hawks (based on the Hawthorn Hawks)
- Sport: Australian rules football
- Founded: 1989
- First season: 1989
- League: Ontario Australian Football League
- Home ground: Humber College North
- President: James Shuttleworth
- Head coach: Kevin Bridgman
- Captain: Pablo Pineda-Willis

Strip
- Brown and Yellow vertical stripes (based on the Hawthorn Hawks)

The Broadview Hawks was an Australian rules football club based in the Broadview area of Toronto, Ontario, Canada.

The club has made Grand Final appearances in 1996, 1999, 2006 and 2012. The Hawks won the premiership in 2013 and 2014.

== History ==
The club was an inaugural member of the Ontario Australian Football League, originally known as the North York Hawks and playing out of the North York area.

In the mid-1990s, the club relocated to the Broadview area and changed the club name.

While enjoying significant onfield success in the mid-2010s where they played in three successive Grand Finals, and won two premierships, the club was perhaps best known for its offield antics, including overnight costume party trips to Ottawa when playing the OAFL team Ottawa Swans, regularly testing the patience of the manager of sponsor pub The Fox and Fiddle on the Danforth, and legendary end of season trips to Cancun, Mexico.
