= Hamilton Wildcats (Australian rules football) =

Names
- Full name: Hamilton Wildcats Australian Football Club
- Nickname: Wildcats

2023 season

Club details
- Founded: 1990; 36 years ago
- Colours
- Competition: AFL Ontario
- President: Nick Liang
- Coach: Justin Settle
- Ground: Mohawk Sports Park

Uniforms
Home

The Hamilton Wildcats are an Australian rules football team formed in 1990 in Canada. Their men's and women's teams currently compete in the AFL Ontario (AFLO).

== History ==
The club was established in 1990 as the "Hamilton Wildcats AFC" by Bill Frampton, an entrepreneur who took an interest in Australian football. He was inspired on the rapid growth of other OAFL teams in the 1980s. After promoting and recruiting players, the team played their inaugural match in the 1990 summer season.

In July 1995 the Wildcats were invited to demonstrate the game of Australian rules football in front of 21,000 spectators during a half-time of a Canadian Football League match. After that, the club signed a contract to broadcast their home games on a local TV channel. The Wildcats were runner ups in the 1996 season.

A women's section was added to the club in 2012, also joining the OAFL. Seven years later, the women's team won their first premiership.
