= Grand River Gargoyles =

Canadian Australian rules football club

- Full name: Grand River Gargoyles
- Nickname: The Gargoyles
- Sport: Australian rules football
- Founded: 2001 by Bruce Parker
- League: AFL Ontario
- Home ground: Margaret Greene Park
- Anthem: "Gargoyleland" (To the tune of the Richmond Tigers club song.)
- President: Stephen McLeod
- Head coach: Tim Trembath

Strip
- Maroon and Gold (Modification on the Brisbane Lions Kit)

The Grand River Gargoyles (previously Guelph Gargoyles) is an amateur Australian rules football club playing out of Margaret Greene Park in Guelph, Ontario, Canada. The club draws from individuals from Guelph, Kitchener, Waterloo, Cambridge, Milton and other Southwestern Ontario cities. They are the only Aussie Rules club to represent the region. The club began in 2001 and plays in the AFL Ontario along with 9 other clubs from Toronto, Hamilton and Ottawa.
