= Etobicoke Kangaroos =

Names
- Full name: Etobicoke Kangaroos Australian Football Club
- Nickname(s): Kangaroos,'Roos

2018 season
- After finals: Preliminary Finalists (0-2 Finals)
- Home-and-away season: 3rd (9-3 Home & Away)
- Leading goalkicker: Nicola Kirwan (1st in League)
- Best and fairest: Nicola Kirwan

Club details
- Founded: 2003
- Colours: Royal Blue and White
- Competition: AFL Ontario
- President: Nick Papadakis (since 2016)
- Coach: TBC
- Captain: TBC
- Ground: Colonel Samuel Smith Park (Humber South)

Other information
- Official website: www.etobicokekangaroos.com

The Etobicoke Kangaroos is an amateur Australian Football club based in Toronto, Ontario, Canada. They are members of the AFL Ontario.

The club made a surprise Grand Final appearance in 2003 (their first year of competition) and lost to the Toronto Dingos. The Kangaroos lost to the Toronto Eagles in the 2007 and 2009 Grand Final. In 2008, the Kangaroos defeated Toronto to post their first OAFL premiership. The Kangaroos won back-to-back Premierships in 2011 (vs High Park) and in 2012 (vs Broadview Hawks). The Kangaroos won two premierships in season 2015, adding their fourth division 1 premiership by defeating the Toronto Eagles and their first Women's premiership after the Lady Roos defeated the Hamilton Wildcats. In 2016, the men's team suffered two defeats in a row in the finals, crashing out of a Preliminary Final against the Toronto Rebels. The Lady Roos went won the 2016, 2017, and 2018 premierships.

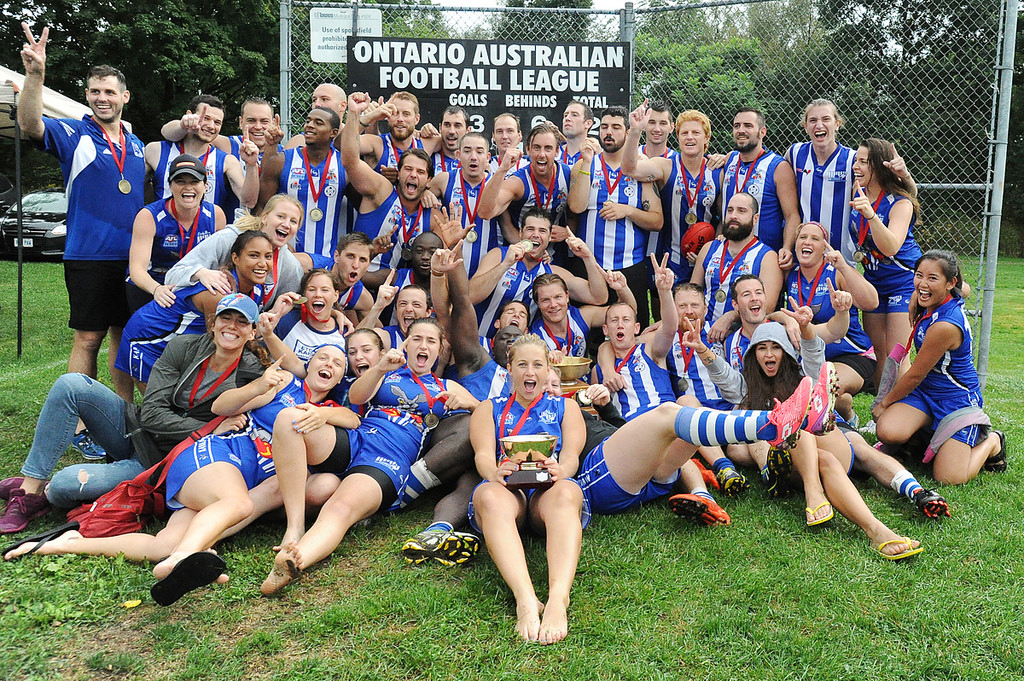
2015 AFL Ontario Men's and Women's Division 1 Premiers
