= High Park Demons =

Australian rules football club in Canada

- Full name: High Park Demons Australian Football Club
- Nickname: The Demons
- Sport: Australian rules football
- Founded: 1989
- First season: 1989
- League: AFL Ontario
- Home ground: Colonel Samuel Smith Park
- Anthem: "It's a Grand Old Flag"
- President: Darren Powell
- Head coach: Dale Simnett, Candace Kwan
- Captain: Alex Hendrix

Strip
- Red and blue guernsey, white shorts, red socks

The High Park Demons (formerly known as the Mississauga Demons and Mississauga Mustangs) is an amateur Australian rules football club based in Toronto, Ontario, Canada.

== History ==
The team began in 1989 as the Mississauga Mustangs, an inaugural member of the Canadian Australian Football Association.

On 12 October 1989, during half time of an exhibition match between the AFL teams Melbourne Demons and Geelong Football Club in Toronto, footy jumpers were presented to the team captain of the Mustangs.

Two days later the Mustangs were defeated by the Panthers 65 to 48, winning the inaugural Conacher Cup.

In 1999, the Brampton Wolverines disbanded due to a shortage of players, with the remaining players joining the Mississauga Mustangs.

In 2004, the team was renamed the Demons, and adopted the identity of the Melbourne Demons AFL club.

In 2007, the club relocated to High Park and changed their name.

== OAFL Premierships ==
- 1994
