= Colonel Samuel Smith Park =

Park in Toronto, Ontario, Canada

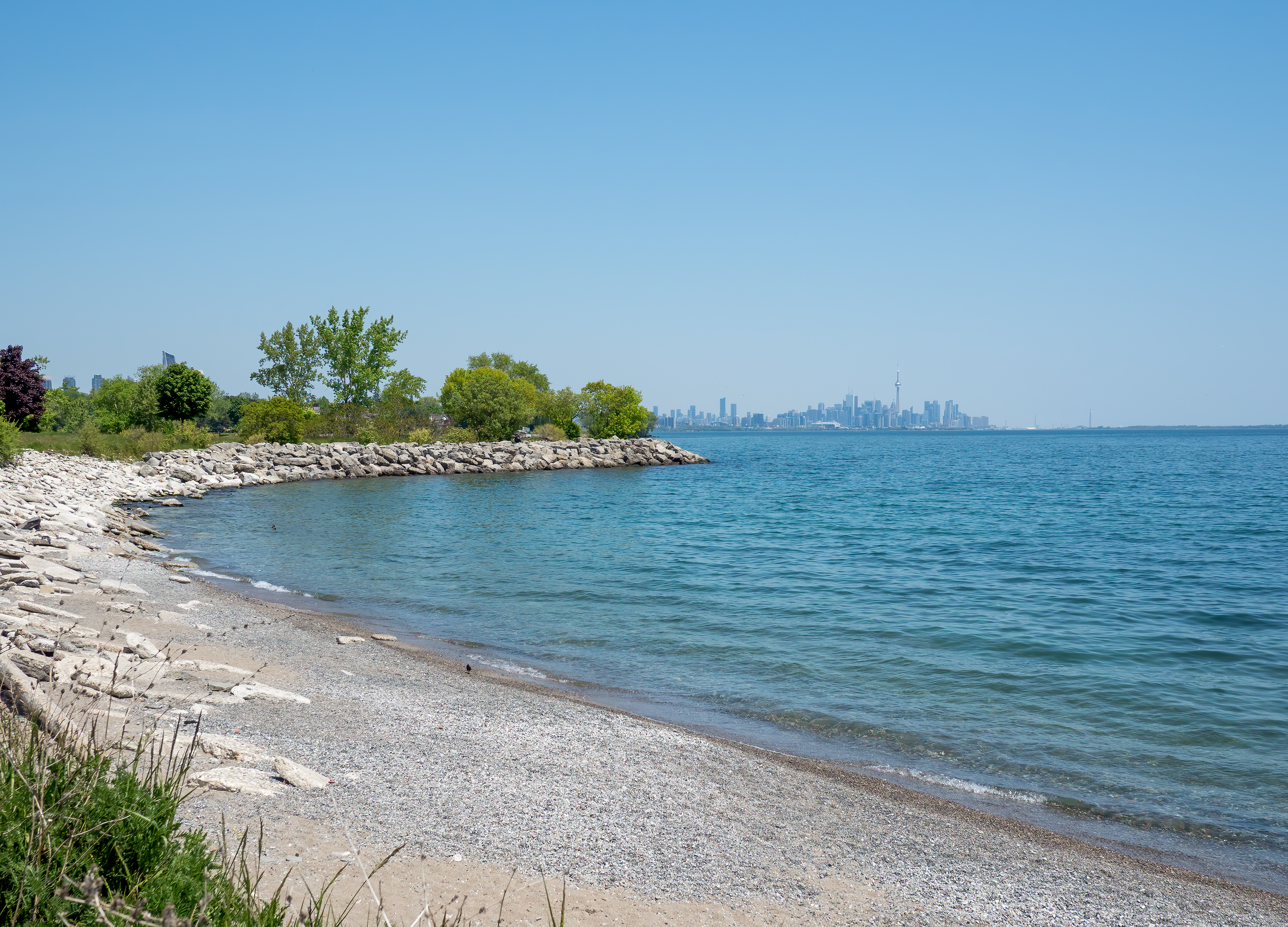

- Location within Toronto
- Interactive map of Colonel Samuel Smith Park
- Type: Urban park
- Location: 3145 Lake Shore Boulevard West; Toronto, Ontario; M8V 1L4
- Coordinates: 43°35′44″N 79°30′41″W
- Area: 194.6 acres (78.8 ha)
- Created: September 8, 1996
- Open: 1996

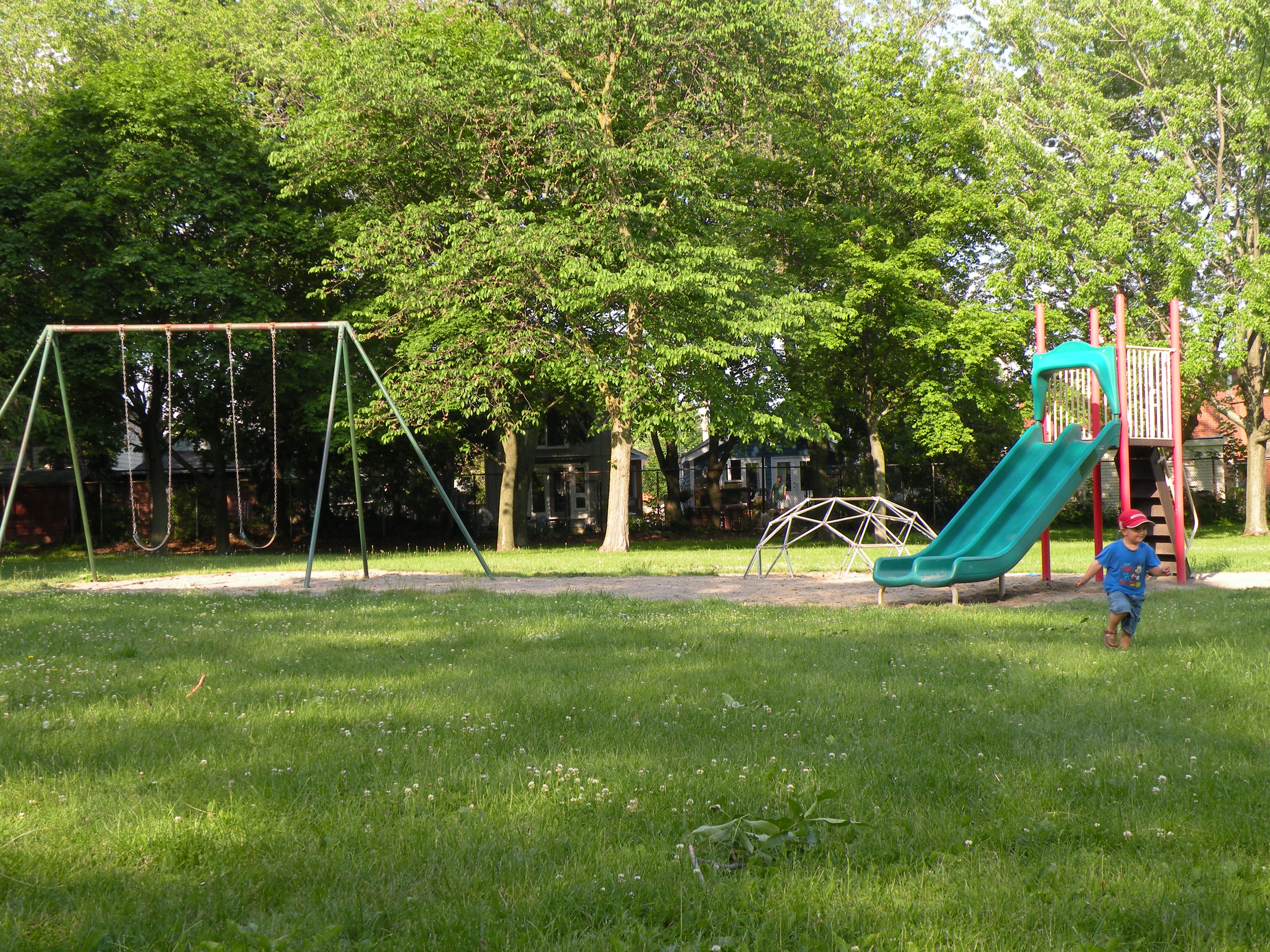
Playground in Colonel Samuel Smith Park

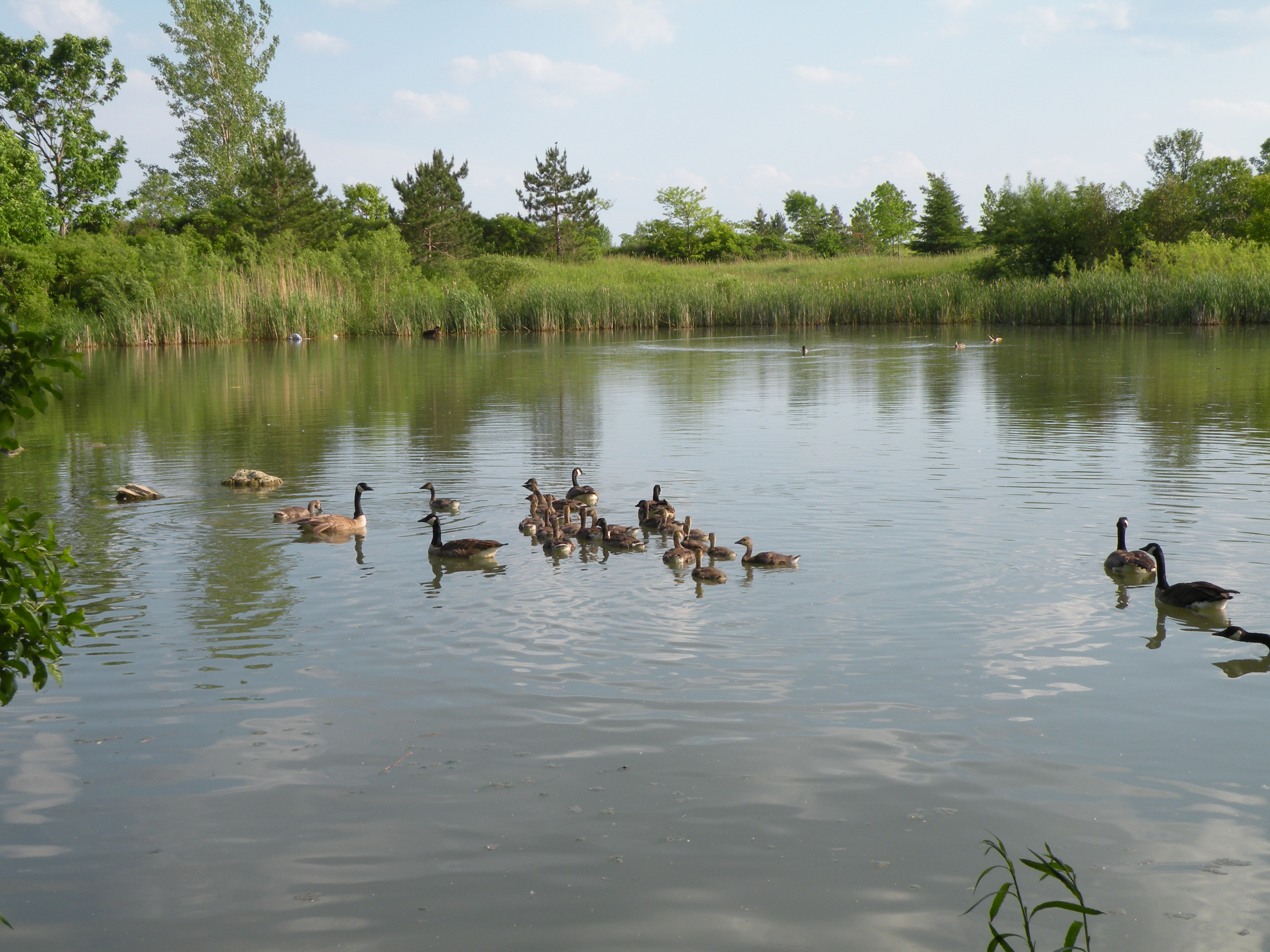
Birds in Colonel Samuel Smith Park

Colonel Samuel Smith Park is an urban park in the Etobicoke district of Toronto, Ontario, Canada and a former weekend get-away destination for Victorian Torontonians. The park has a variety of attractions, including a children's playground located only steps from Lake Ontario. The park is named for Lieutenant Colonel Samuel Smith and lands were part of his property in the 1800s. The park was developed from the 1970s onwards and opened in 1996.

A scenic hiking trail along a peninsula on Lake Ontario provides access to the waterfront, and to several rocky beaches with views of the lake or for birdwatching. A nearby yacht club provides opportunities for boat watching. The park offers a panoramic view of the city, with the iconic CN Tower visible on a clear day, as well as prime fishing spots and other outdoor activities.

Great blue heron catches fish at Colonel Samuel Smith Park

Throughout the park are observation decks, from which visitors may spot wildlife engaged in various activities, such as turtles sunning themselves on the rocks, groups of baby ducks and swans, beaver dams and even the beavers themselves. Over one hundred bird species nest in the area.

There are picnic areas along the trail and on the beaches, as well as a sheltered area with tables for group gatherings on the south side of the Humber College campus adjacent to the cricket pitch. The park offers playground area with double slide and swing set a short walk from the picnic shelter.

Colonel Samuel Smith Park also organizes several special events in the summer, which are famous with the locals and attract visitor from near and far. The Brass in the Grass is a Lakeshore summer tradition with jazz and blues bands playing all weekend well into the night, special attractions and activities for the kids, food stands and more. A number of traveling fairs and amusement parks stop by Samuel Smith during the summer as well, especially on the long weekends. Children and parents flock from the entire southern Etobicoke for the rides, roller-coasters, carnival games, cotton candy and face painting.

Parking is available on the bottom of Kipling Avenue, along Lake Shore Blvd. or on the numerous side streets in the area (some fees may apply).
