= Central Blues =

Amateur Australian football club located in downtown Toronto, Canada

- Nickname: Blues
- Sport: Australian rules football
- Founded: 2005
- First season: 2006
- League: AFL Ontario
- Home ground: Humber College South (matches); Coronation Park and Cherry Beach (training sessions)
- Anthem: "We are the Navy Blues"
- President: Ewan Williams
- Head coach: James Boyd and Ewan Williams (men's), Vera Santillana (women's)
- Captain: Sam Tyrrell & Ewan Williams (2023)

Strip
- Navy blue and white CFC logo with red maple leaf (based on the Carlton Blues)

The Toronto Central Blues are an Australian rules football club based in Toronto, Ontario, Canada.

== History ==
The club was founded in 2005 by former Guelph Gargoyles players Bruce Parker and Rob Chapman. The club is well-supported, and enjoys an active alumni network.

In 2008 the Blues finished 5th and qualified for finals for the first time in the club's brief history. The Blues would go on to defeat the Guelph Gargoyles in Round 1, but experienced defeat in the Preliminary Final at the hand of the Broadview Hawks.

2009 saw the club finish 6th at the end of the regular season to make it into the Finals for the 2nd consecutive season. The club managed to once again surprise their opponent (Toronto Dingos) to easily win their first Final, only to lose to the Etobicoke Kangaroos in the Preliminary Final to end up 4th overall.

=== Grand Finals ===
In 2010 the Central Blues won their first OAFL Premiership versus their downtown Toronto rivals the Toronto Dingos.

In 2014 the Central Blues overcame a 7–5 season to advance to the Grand Final, narrowly losing to the Broadview Hawks.

=== Women's team ===
In 2009 the Central Blues expanded to include Ontario's first organized women's Australian football team. The women's team was started by Bruce Parker and Sherrelle Kelly-Witt.
