= Toronto Downtown Dingos =

Canadian Australian rules football club

Toronto Dingos
- Full name: Toronto Dingos
- Nickname: Downtown Dingos
- Sport: Australian rules football
- Founded: 1996
- League: AFL Ontario
- Anthem: "It's a Grand Old Flag"
- President: Justin Robertson
- Head coach: Justin Robertson
- Captain: Mike Bocian
- Championships: 2000, 2003, 2004, 2005, 2026

Strip
- Black with red sash (based on the Essendon Football Club)

The Toronto Dingos is an amateur Australian rules football club based in Toronto, Ontario, Canada competing in the AFL Ontario.

The club was formed in February 1996 and train at David A. Balfour Dog Park located at Yonge & St. Clair, playing their home games at Humber College (Lakeshore Campus) in Etobicoke, Toronto, Ontario, Canada.

Since entering the competition, the Dingos have won 5 premierships, and have competed in finals regularly over the years.

== Club Award Winners ==
=== Craig Stewart Medal (Best & Fairest) ===
year	Canadian/International	Australian
2023	Matteo Lugarini	Ben Sinclair
2022	Greg Gilbert	Ben Sinclair
2021	no Official AFL Ontario Competition Due to Covid-19 Pandemic
2020	no Official AFL Ontario Competition Due to Covid-19 Pandemic
2019	Greg Gilbert	Michael Ladd
2018	Steven Donnelly	Michael Ladd
2017	Patrick Bossey	Steven Speers
2016	Michael Bocian	Rob Mcnaughton
2015	James Duggan	Wade Edwards
2014	Tom Bell	Alex Aitken
2013	James Duggan	Wade Edwards
2012	Tom Bell	Anthony O'Brien
2011	James Duggan	Craig Stewart
2010	Everett Wells	Craig Stewart
2009	Andrew Andersen	Mick McFarlane
2008	Mike Karas	Mick McFarlane
2007	Bryan Wells	Mick McFarlane
2006	Yoni Moussadji	Craig Stewart
2005	Cam Saylor	Craig Stewart
2004	Chris Buczkowski	Craig Stewart
2003	Danny Mcilravey	Craig Stewart
2002	Bryan Wells	Phil Hynes
2001	Chris Cunning	Emile Studham
2000	Chris Cunning	Josh Dray
1999	Dave Duncan	Stuart Wallis
1998	Chris Cunning	Paul Tinkler
1997	Chris Cunning	Todd Miles
1996	Chris Cunning	Paul Tinkler

=== Leading Goal Kicker ===
year	leading Goalkicker
2023	Ben Sinclair (32)
2022	Ben Sinclair (20)
2021	no Official AFL Ontario Competition Due to Covid-19 Pandemic
2020	no Official AFL Ontario Competition Due to Covid-19 Pandemic
2019	Thomas Santibanez-espinosa (18)
2018	Robert Mcnaughton (54)
2017	Robert Mcnaughton (24)
2016	Robert Mcnaughton (24)
2015	Wade Edwards (75)
2014	C. Buczkowski & T. Humphries (16)
2013	Wade Edwards (36)
2012	Craig Stewart (23)
2011	Craig Stewart (45)
2010	Chris Buczkowski (24)
2009	Chris Buczkowski (34)
2008	Craig Stewart (30)
2007	Craig Stewart (22)
2006	Craig Stewart (27)
2005	Chris Buczkowski (24)
2004	Chris Buczkowski (28)
2003	Craig Stewart (33)
2002	Paul Tinkler (32)
2001	Emile Studham (34)
2000	Josh Dray (57)
1999	Paul Tinkler (36)
1998	Paul Tinkler (36)
1997	Todd Miles (30)
1996	Mark Jones (22)

=== Rookie of the Year ===
year	rookie of the Year
2023	Matteo Lugarini
2022	Harry Shelton
2021	no Official AFL Ontario Competition Due to Covid-19 Pandemic
2020	no Official AFL Ontario Competition Due to Covid-19 Pandemic
2019	James Bradley
2018	John Curtin
2017	Lynden Evers
2016	Thomas Santabinez-espinoza
2015	Niall O'kane
2014	Colin Turner Bloom
2013	D'Arcy Hill
2012	Denis Cormier
2011	Kyle Timmons
2010	Edsart Heuberger
2009	T. Bell & S. Lanning
2008	James Duggan
2007	James Sheehan
2006	Mike Masney
2005	Cam Saylor
2004	Andrew Nisker
2003	Brad Herd
2002	Bryan Wells
2001	Mike Butcher
2000	George Mccullagh
1999	Jacob Barghout
1998	Jeff Simpson
1997	Allan Scully
1996	Chris Kourtis

=== Jacob Steinberg Award (Best Clubman) ===
year	Jacob Steinberg (Best Clubman)
2023	Ben Sinclair
2022	Steve Gordon
2021	no Official AFL Ontario Competition Due to Covid-19 Pandemic
2020	no Official AFL Ontario Competition Due to Covid-19 Pandemic
2019	Steve Gordon
2018	Patrick Bossey
2017	Steve Gordon
2016	Michael Karas
2015	Justin Robertson
2014	Justin Robertson
2013	Justin Robertson
2012	Mick McFarlane
2011	Jake Steinberg
2010	Dan Prior
2009	Justin Robertson
2008	Craig Stewart
2007	Craig Stewart
2006	David Wells
2005	Paul Tinkler
2004	Chris Buckowski
2003	Stuart Wallis
2002	Jake Steinberg
2001	Peter Gordon
2000	Paul Tinkler
1999	Samm Simon
1998	Chris Kourtis
1997	Sean Darcy
1996	Helga Cunning

=== Player's Player Award ===
year	player's Player
2023	Mike Bocian
2022	Mike Bocian
2021	no Official AFL Ontario Competition Due to Covid-19 Pandemic
2020	no Official AFL Ontario Competition Due to Covid-19 Pandemic
2019	Greg Gilbert
2018	Ben Moller
2017	Steven Speers
2016	Michael Bocian
2015	Shaun Mckay
2014	Tom Humphries

=== Coaches Award ===
year	coaches Award
2023	Chris Jepsen
2022	Harry Shelton
2021	no Official AFL Ontario Competition Due to Covid-19 Pandemic
2020	no Official AFL Ontario Competition Due to Covid-19 Pandemic
2019	Francis Lacasse
2018	Gary Conlon
2017	Ben Moller
2016	Daniel Gunn
2015	Patrick Bossey(Div 1) Kevin Mulholland (Div 2)
2014	Gary Conlon
2013	James Duggan
2012	Patrick Bossey
2011	Tom Bell
2010	James Duggan
2009	Tom Bell
2008	Mike Karas
2007	Mick McFarlane
2006	Yoni Moussadji
2005	Mike Karas
2004	Andrew Nisker
2003	Yoni Moussadji
2002	Bryan Wells
2001	Rick Kromkamp
2000	Jamie Prescott

=== Most Improved Player Award ===
year	most Improved Player
2023	Matt Howell
2022	Andre Hyatt
2021	no Official AFL Ontario Competition Due to Covid-19 Pandemic
2020	no Official AFL Ontario Competition Due to Covid-19 Pandemic
2019	William Whyte
2018	Justin Bell
2017	Eoghan Bergin
2016	Greg Gilbert
2015	Michael Bocian
2014	Joe Carrig
2013	Max Parish
2012	Denis Cormier
2011	Ramsley Blacklock

== AFL Ontario Premierships ==
- 2000
- 2003
- 2004
- 2005
