= AFL Ontario =

North American Australian Football league

- Current season, competition or edition: 2023
- Sport: Australian rules football
- Founded: 1989; 37 years ago
- President: Jaclyn Halliday
- No. of teams: 9
- Country: Canada
- Headquarters: Ontario
- Level on pyramid: 1
- Website: AFLOntario

AFL Ontario is the largest Australian football league in North America. It is currently composed of teams from the Greater Toronto Area, Southwestern Ontario and the National Capital Region, who play off for the Conacher Cup (named after Lionel Conacher), presently awarded to the winner of the annual AFL Ontario Grand Final.

AFL Ontario, along with the North West Pacific Football League is a member of AFL Canada, the governing body for the sport in Canada.

== History ==
AFL Ontario which was originally known as the Canadian Australian Football League (CAFA) and more recently as the Ontario Australian Football League (OAFL), was established in 1989. Two teams were formed that year - the Toronto Panthers and the Mississauga Mustangs, with a draft of interested players prior to a three-game season and Grand Final. The coaches of those inaugural teams – John Pearson (Toronto Panthers) and Terence Wallis (Mississauga Mustangs) brought a significant amount of experience from playing at a high level in Australia. An interesting fact is that the first Grand Final was attended by a number of AFL executives including Ron Barrassi and members of the Geelong Cats and Melbourne Demons.

Founding members of the original competition include: Kingsley Ellis (ex-Fitzroy VFL - lead central Umpire, founder of the Hamilton Tigers), Terence Wallis (founded & coached the Mississauga then Toronto Dingos), Wild Bill Fampton (Mississauga then founded the Brampton Bulldogs), Sandro Mancino (Toronto Eagles, Scarborough Rebels and then founded the Balmy Beach Saints). These pioneers set the foundation for the current competition. During the early years CAFA played a number of International games against visiting teams from Australia (Balmain FC, Golden Oldies touring team) as well as the team representing the Australian Rules league in England. The Canadian team narrowly missed beating the touring Australian teams over the years, but soundly defeated England on the four occasions that it played them (1990–1996) culminating in a strong win by the touring Canadian team in London (1996) coached by Terence Wallis.

In 2011, with the increased interest in women's football, AFL Ontario established their Women's League with great success. With the help of the Ontario Trillium Foundation, 2011 also saw the development of AFL Ontario's junior competition. 2012 saw the women's division double in size to 6 teams competing, and the junior competition continued over the summer holidays.

=== Division 2 ===
In 2009, AFL Ontario launched a second division originally consisting of six founding teams. London (Ontario) AFC withdrew before the official start to the season and the team's players were absorbed into the Quebec Saints. Along with the Saints, the Toronto Central Blues, Broadview Hawks, Etobicoke 'Old Boys' Roos and Toronto Eagles made up the founding five teams of the new OAFL Division 2 competition. In honour of the first Canadian to ever play in the AFL the competition's premiership cup was named the Mike Pyke Cup (named after Mike Pyke).

The OAFL Division 2 season was traditionally shorter than that of the OAFL. In 2009 due to teams playing different numbers of matches the ladder was determined by 'Match Ratio' rather than premiership points. In 2010 all teams competed in 8 rounds and thus the ladder reverted to determining positions by premiership points.

2010 also saw the introduction of hybrid teams. New team the Toronto Rebel Dogs (a partnership between the Toronto Downtown Dingos and the Toronto Rebels) and the 'DevilRoos' (a partnership between the Etobicoke Roos and High Park Demons). The Toronto Eagles withdrew their team from the 2010 season.

== Current Clubs ==
=== Locations ===
Location map of current clubs in the league.

=== Men ===
Club	Colours	Nickname	Home Ground	Est.	Years in OAFL	Premierships	
Club	Colours	Nickname	Home Ground	Est.	Years in OAFL	Total	Years
Grand River (Guelph 2001-2013)		Gargoyles	Margaret Greene Park, Guelph	2001	2001-	0	-
Hamilton		Wildcats	Mohawk Sports Oval, Hamilton	1990	1990-	1	2022
High Park (Mississauga 1989-2006)		Demons	Humber College Australian Football Field, Toronto	1989	1989-	1	1994
Ottawa		Swans	Manotick Polo Field, Kars	2007	2008-	2	2018, 2019
Toronto Dingos		Dingos	Humber College Australian Football Field, Toronto	1996	1996-	4	2000, 2003, 2004, 2005
Toronto Eagles		Eagles	Humber College Australian Football Field, Toronto	1989	1989-	12	1989, 1990, 1991, 1995, 1996, 1997, 1998, 1999, 2017
Toronto Rebels (Scarborough 1990-92; Lawrence Park 1993-2004; Lakeshore 2005-07)		Rebels	Humber College Australian Football Field, Toronto	1990	1990-	7	1992, 1993, 2001, 2016, 2023, 2024, 2025

=== Women ===
Club	Colours	Nickname	Location/Home Ground	Est.	Years in OAFL	Premierships	
Club	Colours	Nickname	Location/Home Ground	Est.	Years in OAFL	Total	Most recent
Etobicoke		Kangaroos	Humber College Australian Football Field, Toronto	2003	2011-	5	2015, 2016, 2017, 2018, 2022
Hamilton		Wildcats	Mohawk Sports Oval, Hamilton	1990	2012-	2	2021, 2023
High Park		Demons	Humber College Australian Football Field, Toronto	1989	2012-	2	2012, 2013
Ottawa		Swans	Manotick Polo Field, Kars	2007	2012-2014, 2018-	3	2014, 2024, 2025
Toronto Central		Blues	Humber College Australian Football Field, Toronto	2006	2011-	0	-

=== Affiliated (non-league) clubs ===
Club	Colours	Nickname	Location	Formed
Barrie		Giants	Barrie	2017
Kingston			Kingston	2018
Forest City		Crows	London	2018
Aussie X			Ontario	2008 (junior development)

== Former clubs ==
=== Men ===
Club	Colours	Nickname	Location/Home Ground	Est.	Years in OAFL	Premierships		Fate
Club	Colours	Nickname	Location/Home Ground	Est.	Years in OAFL	Total	Years	Fate
Balmy Beach		Saints	Toronto		1992-1997	0	-	Folded at beginning of 1997 season
Brampton		Wolverines	Brampton		1993-1999	0	-	Folded after 1999 season
Broadview		Hawks	Humber College Australian Football Field, Toronto		1989-2017	2	2013, 2014	Folded after 2017 season
Central Blues		Blues	Humber College Australian Football Field, Toronto	2005	2006-2023	1	2010	In recess since 2023 season
Etobicoke		Kangaroos	Humber College Australian Football Field, Toronto	2003	2003-2018	4	2008, 2011, 2012, 2015	In recess since 2018 season
London		Magpies	London		2003-2005	0	-	Folded after 2005 season
Quebec		Saints	Montreal		2009-2010	0	-	Withdrew from OAFL after 2010 season due to long travel times
Windsor		Mariners	Windsor		2002-2005	0	-	Folded after 2005 season

=== Women ===
Club	Colours	Nickname	Location/Home Ground	Est.	Years in OAFL	Premierships	
Club	Colours	Nickname	Location/Home Ground	Est.	Years in OAFL	Total	Most recent
Toronto Eagles		Eagles	Humber College Australian Football Field, Toronto	1989	2011	1	2011

== Past champions ==
Year	Premier	Runner-up
1989	Toronto Panthers	Mississauga Mustangs
1990	Toronto Panthers	Mississauga Mustangs
1991	Toronto Panthers	Scarborough Rebels
1992	Scarborough Rebels	Mississauga Mustangs
1993	Lawrence Park Rebels	Toronto Panthers
1994	Mississauga Mustangs	Lawrence Park Rebels
1995	Toronto Eagles	Broadview Hawks
1996	Toronto Eagles	Hamilton Wildcats
1997	Toronto Eagles	Lawrence Park Rebels
1998	Toronto Eagles	Lawrence Park Rebels
1999	Toronto Eagles	Broadview Hawks
2000	Toronto Dingos	Toronto Eagles
2001	Lakeshore Rebels	Toronto Eagles
2002	Toronto Eagles	Toronto Dingos
2003	Toronto Dingos	Etobicoke Kangaroos
2004	Toronto Dingos	Toronto Eagles
2005	Toronto Dingos	Lakeshore Rebels
2006	Toronto Eagles	Broadview Hawks
2007	Toronto Eagles	Etobicoke Kangaroos
2008	Etobicoke Kangaroos	Toronto Eagles

Year	Premier	Runner-up	Division 2 Premier	Division 2 Runner-up	Women's League	Women's League Runner-up
2009	Toronto Eagles	Etobicoke Kangaroos	Quebec Saints	Broadview Hawks	Not contested	
2010	Central Blues	Toronto Dingos	Quebec Saints	Central Blues	Not contested	
2011	Etobicoke Kangaroos	High Park Demons	Etobicoke Kangaroos	Broadview Hawks	Toronto Eagles	Etobicoke Lady Roos
2012	Etobicoke Kangaroos	Broadview Hawks	Broadview Hawks	High Park Demons	High Park Demons	Hamilton Wildcats
2013	Broadview Hawks	Toronto Dingos	Toronto Dingos	Broadview Hawks	High Park Demons	Hamilton Wildcats
2014	Broadview Hawks	Central Blues	Toronto Rebels	Toronto Dingos	Ottawa Swans	Hamilton Wildcats
2015	Etobicoke Kangaroos	Toronto Eagles	Toronto Dingos	Toronto Rebels	Etobicoke Kangaroos	Hamilton Wildcats
2016	Toronto Rebels	Ottawa Swans	Not contested		Etobicoke Kangaroos	Hamilton Wildcats
2017	Toronto Eagles	Toronto Rebels	Not contested		Etobicoke Kangaroos	Central Blues
2018	Ottawa Swans	Toronto Eagles	Not contested		Etobicoke Kangaroos	Ottawa Swans
2019	Ottawa Swans	Hamilton Wildcats	Not contested		Hamilton Wildcats	Etobicoke Kangaroos
2022	Hamilton Wildcats	Toronto Rebels	Not contested		Etobicoke Kangaroos	Hamilton Wildcats
2023	Toronto Rebels	Toronto Dingos	Not contested		Hamilton Wildcats	Etobicoke Kangaroos
2024	Toronto Rebels	Toronto Dingos	Not contested		Ottawa Swans	Hamilton Wildcats
2025	Toronto Rebels	Toronto Dingos	Not contested		Ottawa Swans	Hamilton Wildcats
2026	Toronto Dingos	Toronto Rebels	Not contested		High Park Demons	Ottawa Swans

== Principal venues ==
- Margaret Green Park, Guelph: Grand River Gargoyles
- Mohawk Sports Park, Hamilton: Hamilton Wildcats
- Manotick Polo Club, Ottawa: Ottawa Swans
- Humber College South, Toronto: Etobicoke Kangaroos, Toronto Dingos, High Park Demons, Toronto Rebels, Toronto Eagles and Central Blues

== Participation ==
In 2006, AFL Ontario had around 330 senior players consisting of over 170 Canadian nationals. With the rapid increase in awareness and interest in Australian football in Ontario, this has increased in 2012 with almost 650 senior men and women members.

== See also ==
- AFL Canada
- Australian Football Association of North America
- Australian rules football in Canada
- Countries playing Australian rules football
- United States Australian Football League
