= Toronto Eagles (Australian rules football) =

Names
- Full name: Toronto Eagles Australian Football Club
- Nickname: Eagles
- Club song: We're the Eagles

Club details
- Founded: 1989
- Colours: Blue Gold White
- Competition: AFL Ontario
- President: S.Capoferri
- Coach: A. Falcioni
- Premierships: 1989, 1990, 1991, 1995, 1996, 1997, 1998, 1999, 2002, 2006, 2007, 2009, 2017
- Ground: Humber College North

Other information
- Official website: www.eagleafc.ca
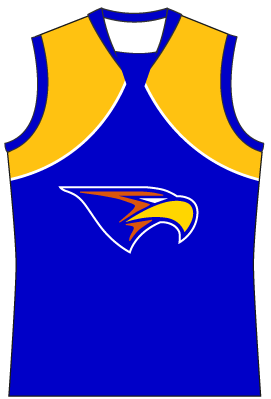
- Guernsey

The Toronto Eagles Australian Football Club (commonly known as the Toronto Eagles) is an amateur Australian rules football club competing in the AFL Ontario Australian football league.

The club was formed in 1989 when the then Canadian Australia Football Association (now known as AFL Ontario) began. They are based at Humber College (North Campus) in Etobicoke, Toronto, Ontario, Canada which has been their home for 10 years. Since entering the competition, the Eagles have become the most successful club in AFL Ontario history, winning 13 premierships, being runners up in 2018, and competing in finals constantly over the years.

== History ==
In 1989, members of the local Australian community in Toronto, Canada congregated to play a number of Australian Rules football matches. Sighting some growing enthusiasm, AFL Ontario, which was then known as the Canadian Australian Football League and more recently as the Ontario Australian Football League (OAFL), was established later that year.

Soon after forming the AFLO, the pioneers of the league formed an affiliation with teams from the Australian Football League (AFL). This affiliation brought forward the formation of two teams – the Toronto Panthers and the Mississauga Mustangs.

1989 was a trying year for the Toronto Panthers as they lost every game that season until the inaugural Grand Final which saw the Toronto Panthers begin a legacy of winning football. The Panthers would defeat the Mississauga Mustangs 65 to 48 in the grand final, winning the inaugural Conacher Cup. The Panthers would then go on to win the next two Premierships, capturing three in a row amidst increasingly difficult competition.

At the end of 1991, amongst pressures of league expansion, many core Panthers left the club to form other teams. During these years, the team was pressured to recruit Canadian born players and introduce them to the game. In the next three years Toronto would fare well with one undefeated season, losing only by disqualification in the play-offs and another, which saw the Panthers once again make it all the way to the Grand Final.

By 1994, the Panthers were attracting many traveling or newly resided Australian players. That, combined with a base of talented Canadians players completed the rebuilding of their Championship squad.

1995 was a turning point for the Toronto Panthers football club as their new membership brought with it a new affiliation. The West Coast Eagles football club of the Australian Football League (AFL) would become the new sister club to the Toronto Panthers. That year the Toronto Panthers were reborn as the Toronto Eagles, trading their white with blue stripes for the blue and gold colors of the West Coast Eagles. To assist the club with the transformation the West Coast Eagles helped by providing team uniforms and footballs, a gesture that was greatly appreciated by the club.

Regenerated as the Toronto Eagles, they then went to be undefeated the entire 1995 season, winning their fourth premiership in six years. Toronto’s high flying Eagles would then go on to capture the next four premierships in a row, establishing themselves as the dominant team in the AFLO. The Eagles would then fare well in the following two seasons but wouldn’t get their hand on the cup until 2002 when they would win their 9th premiership.

2006 and 2007 once again saw the Toronto Eagles tasting premiership glory as they would win back to back flags in impressive style. 2009 would see the Eagles win again, before a rebuilding phase. In 2017 the Eagles secured their 13th AFLO title in 26 seasons, firmly establishing the Toronto Eagles as the only true dynasty in AFL Ontario history.

== Club Symbols ==
The Toronto Eagles official colours are royal blue, gold, and white. The club's current logo features a stylised Wedge-tailed Eagle with the words "Toronto Eagles" written underneath. Previous logos have all incorporated a stylised eagle's head. The club's current guernsey design features a stylised eagle's head taken from the club's logo on navy blue.

The club's official team song is "We're the Eagles", composed by Kevin Peek, a former member of the band Sky, and initially recorded at Peek's studio in Roleystone.

== Club Awards ==
AFL Ontario Premierships

1989 1990 1991 1995 1996 1997 1998 1999 2002 2006 2007 2009 2017

== Club Honour Board ==
Year	Finishing position	Coach	Captain	Troy Marsh Best & Fairest	Leading Goalkicker	Rising Star
1989	Premiers	John Pearson	John Pearson		Kingsley Ellis, Malcolm Foletti, Shaun Ellis, Sandro Mancino (5)	Patrick Grant
1990	Premiers	John Pearson	John Pearson	Peter Vitols	Peter Vitols (49)	Mark Block
1991	Premiers	Peter Vitols/ Mick Pearson	Mark Block	Mark Block	Peter Vitols (52)	John Schraeder
1992	5th	Mick Pearson	Mark Block	Mark Block	Peter Vitols (31)	Ben Strub
1993	2nd	Mick Pearson	Mark Block	Mick Pearson	Mick Pearson (50)	Oliver Mattas
1994	3rd	Mick Pearson	Mark Block	Mick Pearson	Mick Pearson (36)	Arnie Korpela
1995	Premiers	Greg Brown		Rod Cutler	Mick Pearson (68)	
1996	Premiers	Greg Brown		John Law	Mick Pearson (58)	
1997	Premiers	Mark Block/Gary Finch		Arnie Korpela	Mick Pearson (92)	Luke Davies
1998	Premiers	Mark Block/Gary Finch		Troy Marsh	Mick Pearson (20)	
1999	Premiers	Mark Block		Troy Marsh	Troy Marsh (44)	Marc Nord
2000	2nd	Arnie Korpela		Troy Marsh	Mick Pearson (55)	
2001	2nd	Arnie Korpela		Troy Marsh	Mick Pearson (49)	Brian McGillis
2002	Premiers	Arnie Korpela		Troy Marsh	Mark Van Gelder (47)	Taylor Hayward
2003	3rd	Mark Block	Troy Marsh	Troy Marsh	Mark Van Gelder (60)	Matt Bachinski
2004	2nd	Mark Block	Troy Marsh	Troy Marsh	Mark Van Gelder (44)	Kevin Minaker
2005	3rd	Mark Block	Troy Marsh	Troy Marsh	Mark Van Gelder (41)	George Dimacakos
2006	Premiers	Mark Block	Troy Marsh	Troy Marsh	Mark Van Gelder (30)	Frank Luisser
2007	Premiers	Mark Block	Troy Marsh	Aaron Falcioni	Troy Marsh (18)	Aaron Lunadello
2008	2nd	Mark Block	Troy Marsh	Tarquin Netherway	Troy Marsh (59)	Sukhjinder Bhangu
2009	Premiers	Aaron Falcioni	Troy Marsh	Troy Marsh	Troy Marsh (49)	Chris Grey/Brent Jensen
2010	5th	Aaron Falcioni	Tasos Dimacakos	Kevin Minaker	Aaron Falcioni (54)	Samuel Rivett
2011	4th	Aaron Falcioni	Tasos Dimacakos	Ralph Koens	Aaron Falcioni (42)	Nick Nisbett
2012	9th	Aaron Falcioni	Tasos Dimacakos	Kevin Minaker	Aaron Falcioni (32)	Kevin Butler
2013	3rd	Aaron Falcioni	Tasos Dimacakos	Kevin Minaker	Clinton Runnalls (36)	Brad Harding
2014	8th	Aaron Falcioni	Tasos Dimacakos	Kevin Minaker	Aaron Falcioni (26)	Andrew Cober
2015	1st	Aaron Falcioni	Tasos Dimacakos	Mikael Avramov	Aaron Falcioni (38)	Domenic Barranca
2016	6th	Aaron Falcioni	Sean Kennedy	Neil Casey	Aaron Falcioni (40)	

Year	Mark Block Clubman	Coaches Award	Defender of the Year	Cooler Cup
2006	Damien Anderson		Oliver Hayward	Mark Block
2007	David Heward	Kevin Minaker	Matt Bachinski	Tom Hammond
2008	Marc Nord	Matt Bachinski	Tasos Dimacakos	Tom Hammond
2009	Tom Hammond	Kevin Minaker	Matt Bachinski	Tom Hammond
2010	Nick Eddy	Salvatore Capoferri	Sean Kennedy	Tom Hammond
2011	Tom Hammond	Les Husar	Tasos Dimacakos	Adam Farr
2012	Ralph Koens	Tasos Dimacakos	Sean Kennedy	Patrick Larkins
2013	Patrick Larkins	Ryan McNabb	Nate Llewellyn	Nate Llewellyn
2014	Brad Harding	Sean Kennedy	Brad Harding	Tom Hammond
2015	Tom Hammond	Paul Loughnane	Ryan McNabb	Sean Kennedy
2016	-	-	-	Tom Hammond
2017	Matthew Lowden	Sean Westerhuis	Brad Harding	-

Women's Awards

Year	Women's Best & Fairest	Women's Coaches Award
2011	Erin Loughnane	Gillian English

== Individual awards ==
AFL ONTARIO BEST AND FAIREST
The Best and Fairest award is awarded to the best player in the competition during the home-and-away season as voted by the umpires:

Winners

2018 - Dean Gavin
2017 - Dean Gavin
2015 - Mikael Avramov
2009 - Ajit Alister
1997 - Arnie Korpela
1995 - Rod Cutler
1992 - Mark Block
1990 - Mark Block and David Kerr
1989 - Tim Maud

Runner up

2007 - Lockie McDonald

AFL ONTARIO ROOKIE OF THE YEAR

2018 - Sean Fahey
1997 - Luke Davies
1994 - Arnie Korpela
1990 - David Kerr
1989 - Patrick Grant

AFL ONTARIO LEADING GOAL KICKER

2019 - Aaron Falcioni (43)
2008 - Troy Marsh (59)
1999 - Troy Marsh (44)
1994-97 - Mick Pearson
1990-92 - Peter Vitols (49, 52, 31)
