= 2022 U Sports Men's Volleyball Championship =

- Season: 2021–22
- Teams: Eight
- Finals site: Investors Group Athletic Centre; Winnipeg, Manitoba
- Champions: Alberta Golden Bears (9th title)
- Runner-up: Trinity Western Spartans
- Winning coach: Brock Davidiuk (1st title)
- Championship MVP: Jordan Canham (Alberta)
- Television: CBC

The 2022 U Sports Men's Volleyball Championship was held March 25–27, 2022, in Winnipeg, Manitoba, to determine a national champion for the 2021–22 U Sports men's volleyball season. The third-seeded Alberta Golden Bears defeated the top-seeded Trinity Western Spartans in a re-match of the Canada West Championship game as the Golden Bears won the ninth national championship in program history.

== Host ==
The tournament was played at Investors Group Athletic Centre at the University of Manitoba. This was the second time that Manitoba had hosted the tournament with the other occurring in 1978. Manitoba had previously been awarded the hosting duties for the 2020 championship, but that event was cancelled due to the COVID-19 pandemic in Canada.

== Participating teams ==
Seed	Team	Qualified	Record	Last	Total
1	Trinity Western Spartans	Canada West Champion	15–1	2019	6
2	McMaster Marauders	OUA Champion	12–0	None	0
3	Alberta Golden Bears	Canada West Finalist	15–3	2015	8
4	Toronto Varsity Blues	OUA Finalist	11–1	None	0
5	Sherbrooke Vert et Or	RSEQ Champion	8–4	1975	1
6	Queen's Gaels	OUA Bronze	10–1	None	0
7	Calgary Dinos	Canada West Bronze	13–5	2010	4
8	Manitoba Bisons	Lost Week 1 Pool C (Host)	7–11	2003	10

== Championship bracket ==
First Round: March 25
1	Trinity Western Spartans	3
8	Manitoba Bisons	0
4	Toronto Varsity Blues	1
5	Sherbrooke Vert et Or	3
2	McMaster Marauders	1
7	Calgary Dinos	3
3	Alberta Golden Bears	3
6	Queen's Gaels	0

Semi-Finals: March 26
1	Trinity Western Spartans	3
5	Sherbrooke Vert et Or	0
3	Alberta Golden Bears	3
7	Calgary Dinos	1

Gold Medal Game: March 27
1	Trinity Western Spartans	1
3	Alberta Golden Bears	3
Bronze Medal Game: March 27
5	Sherbrooke Vert et Or	3
7	Calgary Dinos	1

=== Bronze medal match ===
27 March 2022; 1:00 p.m. CDT	(5) Sherbrooke Vert et Or	3–1	(7) Calgary Dinos	Investors Group Athletic Centre, Winnipeg; Attendance: 600; Referees: Scott Dziewirz, Ryan Bunyan
27 March 2022; 1:00 p.m. CDT	(25–23, 31–29, 22–25, 25–22); Boxscore			Investors Group Athletic Centre, Winnipeg; Attendance: 600; Referees: Scott Dziewirz, Ryan Bunyan

=== Gold medal match ===
27 March 2022; 4:00 p.m. CDT	(1) Trinity Western Spartans	1–3	(3) Alberta Golden Bears	Investors Group Athletic Centre, Winnipeg; Attendance: 1,500; Referees: Andrew Robb, Matt van Raalte
27 March 2022; 4:00 p.m. CDT	(22–25, 25–12, 24–26, 19–25); Boxscore			Investors Group Athletic Centre, Winnipeg; Attendance: 1,500; Referees: Andrew Robb, Matt van Raalte

== Consolation bracket ==
Semi-Finals: March 26
4	Toronto Varsity Blues	0
8	Manitoba Bisons	3
2	McMaster Marauders	3
6	Queen's Gaels	1

Fifth Place Game: March 27
2	McMaster Marauders	3
8	Manitoba Bisons	1

== Awards ==
=== Championship awards ===
- Championship MVP – Jordan Canham, Alberta
- R.W. Pugh Fair Play Award – Manitoba Bisons

=== Mikasa Top Performers Presented by Nike Team ===
- Alberta: Jordan Canham
- Trinity Western: Brodie Hofer

=== All-Star Team ===
- Jordan Canham, Alberta
- Landon Currie, Alberta
- Isaac Heslinga, Alberta
- Derek Epp, Trinity Western
- Brodie Hofer, Trinity Western
- Julien Vanier, Sherbrooke
- Hamish Hazelden, Calgary
