= 2024 U Sports Men's Volleyball Championship =

Canadian university volleyball championship

- Season: 2023–24
- Teams: Eight
- Finals site: Athletics & Recreation Centre; Kingston, Ontario
- Champions: Alberta Golden Bears (10th title)
- Runner-up: Sherbrooke Vert et Or
- Winning coach: Brock Davidiuk (2nd title)
- Championship MVP: Isaac Heslinga (Alberta)
- Television: CBC

The 2024 U Sports Men's Volleyball Championship was held from March 14 to March 17, 2024, in Kingston, Ontario, to determine a national champion for the 2023–24 U Sports men's volleyball season. The Canada West Champion Alberta Golden Bears defeated the RSEQ Champion Sherbrooke Vert et Or 3–2 to win their second championship in three years. With the victory, the Golden Bears tied the Manitoba Bisons and Winnipeg Wesmen for the most national championships in U Sports men's volleyball with ten each.

== Host ==
The tournament was hosted by Queen's University at the Athletics & Recreation Centre (ARC) on the school's campus. This was the second time that Queen's had hosted the tournament with the most recent occurring in 2012.

== Scheduled teams ==
Seed	Team	Qualified	Record	Last	Total
1	Sherbrooke Vert et Or	RSEQ Champion	16–0	1975	1
2	Alberta Golden Bears	Canada West Champion	18–6	2022	9
3	McMaster Marauders	OUA Champion	16–4	None	0
4	Queen's Gaels	OUA Finalist (Host)	15–5	None	0
5	Trinity Western Spartans	Canada West Finalist	16–8	2023	6
6	UBC Thunderbirds	Canada West Bronze	16–8	2018	4
7	Laval Rouge et Or	RSEQ Finalist	10–6	2013	4
8	Guelph Gryphons	OUA Bronze	15–5	None	0

== Championship bracket ==
First Round: March 14
1	Sherbrooke Vert et Or	3
8	Guelph Gryphons	0
4	Queen's Gaels	3
5	Trinity Western Spartans	2
2	Alberta Golden Bears	3
7	Laval Rouge et Or	1
3	McMaster Marauders	1
6	UBC Thunderbirds	3

Semi-Finals: March 15
1	Sherbrooke Vert et Or	3
4	Queen's Gaels	0
2	Alberta Golden Bears	3
6	UBC Thunderbirds	0

Gold Medal Game: March 17
1	Sherbrooke Vert et Or	2
2	Alberta Golden Bears	3
Bronze Medal Game: March 17
4	Queen's Gaels	1
6	UBC Thunderbirds	3

=== Bronze medal match ===
17 March 2024; 3:00 p.m. EDT	(4) Queen's Gaels	1–3	(5) UBC Thunderbirds	Athletics & Recreation Centre; Kingston, Ontario
17 March 2024; 3:00 p.m. EDT	(27–29, 24–26, 27–25, 17–25); Boxscore			Athletics & Recreation Centre; Kingston, Ontario

=== Gold medal match ===
17 March 2024; 7:00 p.m. EDT	(1) Sherbrooke Vert et Or	2–3	(2) Alberta Golden Bears	Athletics & Recreation Centre; Kingston, Ontario
17 March 2024; 7:00 p.m. EDT	(16–25, 26–24, 22–25, 25–19, 13–15); Boxscore			Athletics & Recreation Centre; Kingston, Ontario

== Consolation bracket ==
Semi-Finals: March 16
5	Trinity Western Spartans	3
8	Guelph Gryphons	2
3	McMaster Marauders	0
7	Laval Rouge et Or	3

Fifth Place Game: March 17
5	Trinity Western Spartans	3
7	Laval Rouge et Or	1

== Awards ==
=== Championship awards ===
- Championship MVP – Isaac Heslinga, Alberta

=== Mikasa Players of the Game ===
- Alberta: Liam Espedido
- Sherbrooke: Johnathan Portelance

=== All-Star Team ===
- Liam Espedido, Alberta
- Isaac Heslinga, Alberta
- Zachary Moisan, Sherbrooke
- Jonathan Portelance, Sherbrooke
- Jacob Sargent, Alberta
- Erik Siksna, Queen's
- James Vincett, UBC
