= 2020 U Sports Men's Volleyball Championship =

Canadian university volleyball championship

- Season: 2019–20
- Teams: Eight
- Finals site: Investors Group Athletic Centre; Winnipeg, Manitoba
- Champions: No champion

The 2020 U Sports Men's Volleyball Championship was scheduled to be held March 13–15, 2020, in Winnipeg, Manitoba, to determine a national champion for the 2019–20 U Sports men's volleyball season. The tournament was cancelled on the first day that games were scheduled to be played due to the COVID-19 pandemic in Canada. This was the first time that a national championship had not been played since it was first contested in 1967.

The tournament was scheduled to be played at Investors Group Athletic Centre at the University of Manitoba. It would have been the second time that Manitoba had hosted the tournament with the most recent occurring in 1978. This also would have been the last set of games for long-time Bisons head coach, Garth Pischke, who retired following this season after 36 years with Manitoba.

== Participating teams ==
Seed	Team	Qualified	Record	Last	Total
1	Trinity Western Spartans	Canada West Champion	20–2	2019	6
2	Montreal Carabins	RSEQ Champion	15–1	1970	1
3	Queen's Gaels	OUA Champion	14–4	None	0
4	Alberta Golden Bears	Canada West Finalist	18–4	2015	8
5	Toronto Varsity Blues	OUA Finalist	17–1	None	0
6	McMaster Marauders	OUA Bronze	15–2	None	0
7	Laval Rouge et Or	RSEQ Finalist	11–5	2013	4
8	Manitoba Bisons	10th in Canada West (Host)	8–14	2003	10

== Championship bracket ==
First Round: March 13
1	Trinity Western Spartans
8	Manitoba Bisons
4	Alberta Golden Bears
5	Toronto Varsity Blues
2	Montreal Carabins
7	Laval Rouge et Or
3	Queen's Gaels
6	McMaster Marauders

Semi-Finals: March 14

Gold Medal Game: March 15
Bronze Medal Game: March 15

== Consolation bracket ==
Semi-Finals: March 14

Fifth Place Game: March 15
