= 2021 U Sports Men's Volleyball Championship =

Canadian university volleyball championship

- Season: 2020–21
- Teams: Eight
- Finals site: Richardson Gymnasium; Brandon, Manitoba
- Champions: No champion

The 2021 U Sports Men's Volleyball Championship was scheduled to be held March 19–21, 2021, in Brandon, Manitoba, to determine a national champion for the 2020–21 U Sports men's volleyball season. However, the due to the ongoing COVID-19 pandemic in Canada, it was announced on October 15, 2020, that the tournament was cancelled. It was the second consecutive year that the national championship was cancelled due to the pandemic.

== Host ==
The tournament was scheduled to be played at Richardson Gymnasium at Brandon University. It would have been the first time that Brandon University had hosted the men's tournament. Instead, Brandon was awarded the 2025 hosting rights to compensate for the cancelled tournament this year.

== Scheduled teams ==
- Canada West Representative
- OUA Representative
- RSEQ Representative
- Host (Brandon Bobcats)
- One assigned berth from Canada West
- Two assigned berths from OUA
- One assigned berth from RSEQ
