= 2025 U Sports Men's Volleyball Championship =

Canadian university volleyball championship

- Season: 2024–25
- Teams: Eight
- Finals site: University Healthy Living Centre; Brandon, Manitoba
- Champions: Brandon Bobcats
- Runner-up: Alberta Golden Bears
- Winning coach: Grant Wilson (1st title)
- Championship MVP: Philipp Lauter (Brandon)
- Television: CBC

The 2025 U Sports Men's Volleyball Championship was held March 21–23, 2025, in Brandon, Manitoba, to determine a national champion for the 2024–25 U Sports men's volleyball season. The eighth-seeded host Brandon Bobcats defeated the third-seeded defending champion Alberta Golden Bears to win the first national championship in program history.

== Host ==
The tournament was hosted by Brandon University at the University Healthy Living Centre on the school's campus. This was the first time that Brandon had hosted the tournament.

== Scheduled teams ==
| Seed | Team | Qualified | Record | Last | Total |
|---|---|---|---|---|---|
| 1 | Winnipeg Wesmen | Canada West Champion | 17–3 | 2007 | 10 |
| 2 | Sherbrooke Vert et Or | RSEQ Champion | 14–2 | 1975 | 1 |
| 3 | Alberta Golden Bears | Canada West Finalist | 16–4 | 2024 | 10 |
| 4 | Queen's Gaels | OUA Champion | 15–5 | None | 0 |
| 5 | Saskatchewan Huskies | Canada West Bronze | 14–6 | 2004 | 4 |
| 6 | Windsor Lancers | OUA Finalist | 18–2 | None | 0 |
| 7 | Western Mustangs | OUA Bronze | 10–10 | None | 0 |
| 8 | Brandon Bobcats | Canada West Quarter-Finalist (Host) | 10–10 | None | 0 |

== Championship bracket ==
First Round: March 21
1 | Winnipeg Wesmen | 0
8 | Brandon Bobcats | 3
4 | Queen's Gaels | 1
5 | Saskatchewan Huskies | 3
2 | Sherbrooke Vert et Or | 3
7 | Western Mustangs | 0
3 | Alberta Golden Bears | 3
6 | Windsor Lancers | 0

Semi-Finals: March 22
5 | Saskatchewan Huskies | 2
8 | Brandon Bobcats | 3
2 | Sherbrooke Vert et Or | 2
3 | Alberta Golden Bears | 3

Gold Medal Game: March 23
3 | Alberta Golden Bears | 1
8 | Brandon Bobcats | 3
Bronze Medal Game: March 23
2 | Sherbrooke Vert et Or | 1
5 | Saskatchewan Huskies | 3

=== Bronze medal match ===
| March 23, 2025; 3:00 p.m. CDT | (2) Sherbrooke Vert et Or | 1–3 | (5) Saskatchewan Huskies | University Healthy Living Centre; Brandon, Manitoba |
| March 23, 2025; 3:00 p.m. CDT | (25–19, 21–25, 17–25, 16–25); Boxscore | | | University Healthy Living Centre; Brandon, Manitoba |

=== Gold medal match ===
| March 23, 2025; 6:00 p.m. CDT | (3) Alberta Golden Bears | 1–3 | (8) Brandon Bobcats | University Healthy Living Centre; Brandon, Manitoba |
| March 23, 2025; 6:00 p.m. CDT | (20–25, 25–22, 26–28, 17–25); Boxscore | | | University Healthy Living Centre; Brandon, Manitoba |

== Consolation bracket ==
Semi-Finals: March 22
1 | Winnipeg Wesmen | 3
4 | Queen's Gaels | 2
6 | Windsor Lancers | 3
7 | Western Mustangs | 0

Fifth Place Game: March 23
1 | Winnipeg Wesmen | 3
6 | Windsor Lancers | 0

== Awards ==
=== Championship awards ===
- Championship MVP – Philipp Lauter, Brandon

=== Nike Players of the Game ===
- Alberta: Isaac Heslinga
- Brandon: J.J. Love

=== All-Star Team ===
- Jonathan Portelance, Sherbrooke
- Emmett Graham, Saskatchewan
- Isaac Heslinga, Alberta
- Trent Cherewaty, Alberta
- Philipp Lauter, Brandon
- Liam Pauls, Brandon
- Riley Grusing, Brandon
