= Max Elgert =

Canadian volleyball player (born 1998)

Personal information
- Full name: Maxwell Elgert
- Nationality: Canadian
- Born: 31 August 1998 (age 28)
- Hometown: Athabasca, Alberta, Canada
- Height: 1.93 m (6 ft 4 in)
- Weight: 92 kg (203 lb)
- Spike: 342 cm (135 in)
- Block: 320 cm (126 in)
- Education: University of Alberta

Volleyball information
- Position: Setter
- Current club: Plessis-Robinson

Career
Years	Teams
2016–2022; 2022–2023; 2023–2024; 2024–2025; 2025–	Alberta Golden Bears; BKS Visła Bydgoszcz; SVG Lüneburg; Panathinaikos V.C. Plessis-Robinson

National team
2022–	Canada
- Last updated: 2025-07-07

Maxwell Elgert (born 31 August 1998) is a Canadian volleyball player. He is a member of the Canada men's national volleyball team.

== Career ==
=== Club ===
Elgert attended the University of Alberta, playing for the Alberta Golden Bears from 2016 to 2022. In his last year he helped the team win the U Sports National Championship.

Elgert played his first season of professional volleyball with BKS Visła Bydgoszcz in the Polish first division in 2022. In 2023, he signed for German club SVG Lüneburg.

=== National team ===
Elgert was first named to the Canadian national team roster in 2022.

== Honours ==
=== University ===
- 2016–17 U Sports Men's Volleyball Championship, with Alberta Golden Bears
- 2021–22 U Sports Men's Volleyball Championship, with Alberta Golden Bears
