= U Sports men's volleyball championship =

Canadian university volleyball tournament

- Current season, competition or edition: 2026 U Sports Men's Volleyball Championship
- Sport: Indoor volleyball
- Founded: 1967; 59 years ago
- First season: 1967
- Organizing body: U Sports
- No. of teams: 8
- Country: Canada
- Most recent champion: Trinity Western Spartans (8th title)
- Most titles: Manitoba Bisons (10); Winnipeg Wesmen (10); Alberta Golden Bears (10)
- Website: usports.ca/en/championships/volleyball/m

The U Sports Men's Volleyball Championship is a Canadian university volleyball tournament conducted by U Sports, and determines the men's national champion. The tournament involves the champions from each of Canada's four regional sports conferences. The Tantramar Trophy is awarded to the winners.

The 2026 champions are the Trinity Western Spartans, who won the eighth championship in their program history. The Manitoba Bisons, Winnipeg Wesmen and Alberta Golden Bears have won the most championships with each school having won ten times.

== History ==
The first championship tournament was held in Calgary, Alberta and featured the UBC Thunderbirds defeating the Mount Allison Mounties 3–0 and the Sherbrooke Vert et Or 3–0 en route to being the first CIAU men's volleyball champions. They were given the Tantramar Trophy, named after the Tantramar Marshes in New Brunswick, which was donated in 1967 by Mount Allison University. While early records are not readily available, the championship has been played as a round-robin tournament at least since 1980. In 1983, six teams played in two pools and then, based on the results, advanced to single-elimination games to determine a winner. In 1985, the current format of full single-elimination games was adopted with eight team competing in the tournament.

Both the 2020 and 2021 championship tournaments were cancelled due to the COVID-19 pandemic.

== Format ==
The championship currently consists of an eight-team tournament, with champions from each of the three conferences, one host (from Canada West in 2020 and 2021), an additional Canada West team, two additional OUA teams, and one additional team from the RSEQ. While the berths for the conference champions and host remain consistent year-to-year, the other four invitees can change based on the host's conference and the competitive landscape in U Sports. The championship takes place over three days and features 11 games, with teams seeded 1–8. Teams are ranked by a committee as well as by the ELO ranking used to determine weekly Top 10 rankings nationally. Conference champions can be ranked no lower than 6th place. The team ranked 1st plays the 8th ranked team, 2nd plays 7th, 3rd plays 6th, and 4th plays 5th in the quarter-finals. To ensure common rest times, teams are not re-seeded after the first round, so the winner of 1v8 plays the winner of 4v5 and the winner of 2v7 plays the winner of 3v6. There is also a consolation bracket to determine the third-place winner (bronze medalist) and fifth-place winner. The gold medal game is the last game played in the tournament.

== Results ==
=== Round Robin Format (1967–1982) ===
Year	Host (City)	Championship final			Teams
Year	Host (City)	Champions	Score	Runners-up	Teams
1967	Calgary (Calgary, AB)	UBC Thunderbirds	3–0	Sherbrooke Vert et Or	4
1968	Guelph (Guelph, ON)	Ottawa Gee-Gees	2–0	Manitoba Bisons	5
1969	Mount Allison (Sackville, NB)	Winnipeg Wesmen	N/A	N/A	N/A
1970	Calgary (Calgary, AB)	Montreal Carabins	N/A	N/A	N/A
1971	Laurentian (Sudbury, ON)	Winnipeg Wesmen	3–0	Western Ontario Mustangs	N/A
1972	Laval (Quebec City, QC)	Winnipeg Wesmen	3–0	Montreal Carabins	N/A
1973	Laurentian (Sudbury, ON)	Winnipeg Wesmen	N/A	Laurentian Voyageurs	N/A
1974	Alberta (Edmonton, AB)	Winnipeg Wesmen	N/A	York Yeomen	N/A
1975	Laval (Quebec City, QC)	Sherbrooke Vert et Or	3–0	Alberta Golden Bears	N/A
1976	Manitoba/Winnipeg (Winnipeg, MB)	UBC Thunderbirds	3–1	Sherbrooke Vert et Or	6
1977	Waterloo (Waterloo, ON)	Winnipeg Wesmen	3–0	UBC Thunderbirds	6
1978	Moncton (Moncton, NB)	Manitoba Bisons	3–0	Calgary Dinosaurs	N/A
1979	McMaster (Hamilton, ON)	Saskatchewan Huskies	3–2	Manitoba Bisons	N/A
1980	Saskatchewan (Saskatoon, SK)	Manitoba Bisons	3–1	Saskatchewan Huskies	6
1981	Victoria (Victoria, BC)	Alberta Golden Bears	3–2	Manitoba Bisons	6
1982	Dalhousie (Halifax, NS)	Calgary Dinosaurs	3–1	Manitoba Bisons	6

=== Transition Format (1983–1984) ===
Year	Host (City)	Gold medal match			Bronze medal match			Teams
Year	Host (City)	Gold medalists	Score	Silver medalists	Bronze medalists	Score	4th place	Teams
1983	British Columbia (Vancouver, BC)	UBC Thunderbirds	3–1	Manitoba Bisons	Laval Rouge et Or	3–1	Victoria Vikings	6
1984	Laval (Quebec City, QC)	Manitoba Bisons	3–0	UBC Thunderbirds	Waterloo Warriors	3–0	Dalhousie Tigers	6

=== Single Elimination Format (1985–present) ===
Year	Host (City)	Gold medal match			Bronze medal match			Teams
Year	Host (City)	Gold medalists	Score	Silver medalists	Bronze medalists	Score	4th place	Teams
1985	York (North York, ON)	Manitoba Bisons	3–0	Saskatchewan Huskies	Toronto Varsity Blues	3–0	Dalhousie Tigers	8
1986	Moncton (Moncton, NB)	Winnipeg Wesmen	3–2	Manitoba Bisons	Saskatchewan Huskies	3–1	UBC Thunderbirds	8
1987	Winnipeg (Winnipeg, MB)	Winnipeg Wesmen	3–0	Saskatchewan Huskies	Manitoba Bisons	3–2	Calgary Dinosaurs	8
1988	Guelph (Guelph, ON)	Saskatchewan Huskies	3–1	Manitoba Bisons	Calgary Dinosaurs	3–0	Dalhousie Tigers	8
1989	Calgary (Calgary, AB)	Calgary Dinosaurs	3–0	Manitoba Bisons	York Yeomen	3–0	Waterloo Warriors	8
1990	Winnipeg (Winnipeg, MB)	Laval Rouge et Or	3–0	Manitoba Bisons	Waterloo Warriors	3–0	Saskatchewan Huskies	8
1991	Laval (Quebec City, QC)	Manitoba Bisons	3–0	Toronto Varsity Blues	Waterloo Warriors	3–2	Sherbrooke Vert et Or	8
1992	Winnipeg (Winnipeg, MB)	Laval Rouge et Or	3–0	Calgary Dinosaurs	Montreal Carabins	3–1	Winnipeg Wesmen	8
1993	Alberta (Edmonton, AB)	Calgary Dinosaurs	3–0	Montreal Carabins	Winnipeg Wesmen	3–0	Manitoba Bisons	8
1994	Dalhousie (Halifax, NS)	Laval Rouge et Or	3–0	Manitoba Bisons	Dalhousie Tigers	3–2	Alberta Golden Bears	8
1995	Laurentian (Sudbury, ON)	Manitoba Bisons	3–2	Laval Rouge et Or	Dalhousie Tigers	3–2	Alberta Golden Bears	8
1996	Calgary (Calgary, AB)	Manitoba Bisons	3–1	Alberta Golden Bears	Laval Rouge et Or	3–1	Winnipeg Wesmen	8
1997	Calgary (Calgary, AB)	Alberta Golden Bears	3–0	Dalhousie Tigers	Winnipeg Wesmen	3–1	Calgary Dinosaurs	8
1998	Calgary (Calgary, AB)	Winnipeg Wesmen	3–0	Saskatchewan Huskies	Alberta Golden Bears	3–1	Toronto Varsity Blues	8
1999	Laval (Quebec City, QC)	Saskatchewan Huskies	3–0	Laval Rouge et Or	Alberta Golden Bears	3–2	Calgary Dinos	8
2000	Laval (Quebec City, QC)	Manitoba Bisons	3–1	Saskatchewan Huskies	Winnipeg Wesmen	3–0	Dalhousie Tigers	8
2001	Laval (Quebec City, QC)	Manitoba Bisons	3–1	Laval Rouge et Or	Calgary Dinos	3–0	Saskatchewan Huskies	8
2002	Alberta (Edmonton, AB)	Alberta Golden Bears	3–2	Winnipeg Wesmen	Manitoba Bisons	3–0	Laval Rouge et Or	8
2003	Alberta (Edmonton, AB)	Manitoba Bisons	3–0	Alberta Golden Bears	Saskatchewan Huskies	3–2	Calgary Dinos	8
2004	Laval (Quebec City, QC)	Saskatchewan Huskies	3–2	Alberta Golden Bears	Trinity Western Spartans	3–1	Manitoba Bisons	8
2005	Laval (Quebec City, QC)	Alberta Golden Bears	3–2	Trinity Western Spartans	Manitoba Bisons	3–2	Saskatchewan Huskies	8
2006	McMaster (Hamilton, ON)	Trinity Western Spartans	3–0	Alberta Golden Bears	Manitoba Bisons	3–1	Dalhousie Tigers	8
2007	McMaster (Hamilton, ON)	Winnipeg Wesmen	3–2	Alberta Golden Bears	Trinity Western Spartans	3–0	UBC Thunderbirds	8
2008	Laval (Quebec City, QC)	Alberta Golden Bears	3–1	Winnipeg Wesmen	TRU WolfPack	3–2	Dalhousie Tigers	8
2009	Alberta (Edmonton, AB)	Alberta Golden Bears	3–0	Laval Rouge et Or	Brandon Bobcats	3–1	McMaster Marauders	8
2010; Details	Thompson Rivers (Kamloops, BC)	Calgary Dinos	3–1	Trinity Western Spartans	Alberta Golden Bears	3–0	Laval Rouge et Or	8
2011; Details	Trinity Western (Langley, BC)	Trinity Western Spartans	3–0	Brandon Bobcats	Calgary Dinos	3–2	Laval Rouge et Or	8
2012; Details	Queen's (Kingston, ON)	Trinity Western Spartans	3–1	Laval Rouge et Or	Manitoba Bisons	3–1	Queen's Gaels	8
2013; Details	Laval (Quebec City, QC)	Laval Rouge et Or	3–1	McMaster Marauders	Brandon Bobcats	3–1	Western Mustangs	8
2014; Details	Calgary (Calgary, AB)	Alberta Golden Bears	3–0	Western Mustangs	McMaster Marauders	3–0	Laval Rouge et Or	8
2015; Details	Saskatchewan (Saskatoon, SK)	Alberta Golden Bears	3–0	Trinity Western Spartans	McMaster Marauders	3–0	Dalhousie Tigers	8
2016; Details	McMaster (Hamilton, ON)	Trinity Western Spartans	3–1	McMaster Marauders	Alberta Golden Bears	3–0	Saskatchewan Huskies	8
2017; Details	Alberta (Edmonton, AB)	Trinity Western Spartans	3–1	Alberta Golden Bears	McMaster Marauders	3–0	UBC Thunderbirds	8
2018; Details	McMaster (Hamilton, ON)	UBC Thunderbirds	3–0	Trinity Western Spartans	McMaster Marauders	3–0	Alberta Golden Bears	8
2019; Details	Laval (Quebec City, QC)	Trinity Western Spartans	3–0	Brandon Bobcats	Laval Rouge et Or	3–1	Alberta Golden Bears	8
2020; Details	Manitoba (Winnipeg, MB)	Cancelled due to the COVID-19 pandemic			Cancelled due to the COVID-19 pandemic			8
2021; Details	Brandon (Brandon, MB)	Cancelled due to the COVID-19 pandemic			Cancelled due to the COVID-19 pandemic			8
2022; Details	Manitoba (Winnipeg, MB)	Alberta Golden Bears	3–1	Trinity Western Spartans	Sherbrooke Vert et Or	3–1	Calgary Dinos	8
2023; Details	McMaster (Hamilton, ON)	Trinity Western Spartans	3–0	Sherbrooke Vert et Or	McMaster Marauders	3–0	Alberta Golden Bears	8
2024; Details	Queen's (Kingston, ON)	Alberta Golden Bears	3–2	Sherbrooke Vert et Or	UBC Thunderbirds	3–1	Queen's Gaels	8
2025; Details	Brandon (Brandon, MB)	Brandon Bobcats	3–1	Alberta Golden Bears	Saskatchewan Huskies	3–1	Sherbrooke Vert et Or	8
2026; Details	Windsor (Windsor, ON)	Trinity Western Spartans	3–2	UBC Thunderbirds	Manitoba Bisons	3–0	Windsor Lancers	8
2027; Details	Mount Royal (Calgary, AB)							8
2028; Details	Saskatchewan (Saskatoon, SK)							8

== Results by schools ==
Due to information limitations, the following table includes all known first, second, and third-place finishes, as indicated above. Prior to 1983, there were no third-place finishes, and the second-place finish was the loser of the championship game. While the Dalhousie Tigers now play in the RSEQ, they had won their medals while playing in the AUS conference, which no longer fields men's volleyball teams.

Team	Conference	1st	2nd	3rd	Last
Manitoba Bisons	Canada West	10	10	6	2003
Alberta Golden Bears	Canada West	10	8	4	2024
Winnipeg Wesmen	Canada West	10	2	3	2007
Trinity Western Spartans	Canada West	8	5	2	2026
Laval Rouge et Or	RSEQ	4	5	3	2013
Saskatchewan Huskies	Canada West	4	5	3	2004
Calgary Dinos	Canada West	4	2	3	2010
UBC Thunderbirds	Canada West	4	3	1	2018
Sherbrooke Vert et Or	RSEQ	1	4	1	1975
Brandon Bobcats	Canada West	1	2	2	2025
Montreal Carabins	RSEQ	1	2	1	1970
Ottawa Gee-Gees	RSEQ	1	0	0	1968
McMaster Marauders	OUA	0	2	5	None
Western Mustangs	OUA	0	2	0	None
Dalhousie Tigers	AUS	0	1	2	None
York Yeomen	OUA	0	1	1	None
Toronto Varsity Blues	OUA	0	1	1	None
Waterloo Warriors	OUA	0	0	3	None
Laurentian Voyageurs	OUA	0	0	1	None
TRU WolfPack	Canada West	0	0	1	None

== See also ==
- NCAA men's volleyball tournament
