= 2026 U Sports Men's Volleyball Championship =

Canadian university volleyball championship

- Season: 2025–26
- Teams: Eight
- Finals site: Toldo Lancer Centre; Windsor, Ontario
- Champions: Trinity Western Spartans (8th title)
- Runner-up: UBC Thunderbirds
- Winning coach: Adam Schriemer (2nd title)
- Tournament MVP: Anselm Rein (Trinity Western)
- Television: CBC Gem

The 2026 U Sports Men's Volleyball Championship was held March 13–15, 2026, in Windsor, Ontario, to determine the national champion for the 2025–26 U Sports men's volleyball season. The first-seeded Canada West champion Trinity Western Spartans defeated the seventh-seeded UBC Thunderbirds 3–2 to win the eighth title in program history.

== Host ==
The tournament was hosted by the University of Windsor at the Toldo Lancer Centre on the school's campus. It was the first U Sports championship to be played at the venue since it opened in 2022. This also marked the first time that Windsor had hosted the tournament.

== Scheduled teams ==
Seed	Team	Qualified	Record	Last	Total
1	Trinity Western Spartans	Canada West Champion	17–3	2023	7
2	Queen's Gaels	OUA Champion	14–6	None	0
3	Laval Rouge et Or	RSEQ Champion	11–5	2013	4
4	Windsor Lancers	OUA Finalist (Host)	18–2	None	0
5	Montreal Carabins	RSEQ Finalist	14–2	1970	1
6	Manitoba Bisons	Canada West Finalist	14–6	2003	10
7	UBC Thunderbirds	Canada West Bronze	19–1	2018	4
8	Western Mustangs	OUA Bronze	13–7	None	0

== Championship bracket ==
First Round: March 13
1	Trinity Western Spartans	3
8	Western Mustangs	0
4	Windsor Lancers	3
5	Montreal Carabins	2
2	Queen's Gaels	1
7	UBC Thunderbirds	3
3	Laval Rouge et Or	0
6	Manitoba Bisons	3

Semi-Finals: March 14
1	Trinity Western Spartans	3
4	Windsor Lancers	1
7	UBC Thunderbirds	3
6	Manitoba Bisons	1

Gold Medal Game: March 15
1	Trinity Western Spartans	3
7	UBC Thunderbirds	2
Bronze Medal Game: March 15
4	Windsor Lancers	0
6	Manitoba Bisons	3

=== Bronze medal match ===
March 15, 2026; 3:00 p.m. EDT	(6) Manitoba Bisons	3–0	(4) Windsor Lancers	Toldo Lancer Centre; Windsor, Ontario; Attendance: 2,000; Referees: Andrew Cameron, Serge Theriault
March 15, 2026; 3:00 p.m. EDT	(25–23, 25–16, 25–23); Boxscore			Toldo Lancer Centre; Windsor, Ontario; Attendance: 2,000; Referees: Andrew Cameron, Serge Theriault

=== Gold medal match ===
March 15, 2026; 6:00 p.m. EDT	(1) Trinity Western Spartans	3–2	(7) UBC Thunderbirds	Toldo Lancer Centre; Windsor, Ontario; Attendance: 600; Referees: Matt Van Raatle, Jason Dodd
March 15, 2026; 6:00 p.m. EDT	(25–22, 15–25, 26–24, 11–25, 15–8); Boxscore			Toldo Lancer Centre; Windsor, Ontario; Attendance: 600; Referees: Matt Van Raatle, Jason Dodd

== Consolation bracket ==
Semi-Finals: March 14
5	Montreal Carabins	3
8	Western Mustangs	2
2	Queen's Gaels	1
3	Laval Rouge et Or	3

Fifth Place Game: March 15
3	Laval Rouge et Or	3
5	Montreal Carabins	2
