= 2027 U Sports Men's Volleyball Championship =

Canadian university volleyball championship

- Season: 2026–27
- Teams: Eight
- Finals site: Kenyon Court; Calgary, Alberta
- Television: CBC Gem

The 2027 U Sports Men's Volleyball Championship is scheduled to be held March 19–21, 2027, in Calgary, Alberta, to determine a national champion for the 2026–27 U Sports men's volleyball season.

== Host ==
The tournament is scheduled to be hosted by Mount Royal University at the Kenyon Court on the school's campus. It will be the first U Sports championship to be hosted by Mount Royal.

== Scheduled teams ==
- Canada West Representative
- OUA Representative
- RSEQ Representative
- Host (Mount Royal Cougars)
- Two assigned berths to Canada West
- One assigned berth to OUA
- One assigned berth to RSEQ

== Championship bracket ==
First Round: March 19
1
8
4
5
2
7
3
6

Semi-Finals: March 20

Gold Medal Game: March 21
Bronze Medal Game: March 21

== Consolation bracket ==
Semi-Finals: March 20

Fifth Place Game: March 21
