= 2028 U Sports Men's Volleyball Championship =

Canadian university volleyball championship

- Season: 2027–28
- Teams: Eight
- Finals site: Physical Activity Centre; Saskatoon, Saskatchewan

The 2028 U Sports Men's Volleyball Championship is scheduled to be held in March 2028, in Saskatoon, Saskatchewan, to determine the national champion for the 2027–28 U Sports men's volleyball season.

== Host ==
The tournament is scheduled to be hosted by the University of Saskatchewan. It will be the third time that Saskatchewan has hosted the tournament, as the school previously hosted the U Sports championship in 1980 and 2015.

== Scheduled teams ==
- Canada West Representative
- OUA Representative
- RSEQ Representative
- Host (Saskatchewan Huskies)
- Four additional berths
