= Russell Paddock =

Canadian volleyball player (born 1966)

Personal information
- Full name: Russell Thomas Paddock
- Nickname: Russ
- Born: 2 August 1966 (age 59) Oak River, Manitoba, Canada
- Height: 202 cm (6 ft 8 in)

Sport
- Country: Canada
- Sport: Volleyball

Russell Thomas Paddock (born 2 August 1966) is a retired Canadian volleyball player, and currently the Director of Athletics and Recreation at Brandon University. He was part of the Canadian men's volleyball team at the 1992 Summer Olympics in Barcelona.

== Playing career ==
Paddock played for the Manitoba Bisons for four seasons, The Bisons were runners-up three of those years (1985-86, 1987-88, 1988-89) and 3rd place winners the other season (1986-87).

While playing for the University of Manitoba Bisons, Paddock was a 1st team All-Canadian twice, in 1987-88 and 1988-89. His time as a Bison is recognized as part of the Bison Walkway of Honour.

Paddock played for the Canada men's national volleyball team for several years, including at the 1992 Summer Olympics in Barcelona, and the 1994 World Championships in Greece.

He also played professionally in Belgium and Germany.

== Coaching and administration career ==
In 2005, Paddock became the first coach of the Brandon Bobcats, coaching them until 2012. He was named Coach of the Year for the 2009-10 season. In 2012, Paddock was named Brandon University's Athletic Director.

Paddock was named to the Manitoba Sports Hall of Fame in 2025.
