= Max Bell Centre =

Max Bell Centre may refer to:

- Max Bell Centre (Calgary), Alberta, Canada
- Max Bell Centre (Winnipeg), Manitoba, Canada
