= Brandon Bobcats =

Brandon University athletic teams

- University: Brandon University
- Association: U Sports (primary); CCAA (soccer)
- Conference: Canada West
- Athletic director: Russ Paddock
- Location: Brandon, Manitoba
- Varsity teams: 8 (4 men's, 4 women's)
- Basketball arena: Healthy Living Centre
- Mascot: Bailey
- Colours: Blue and Gold
- Website: gobobcats.ca

The Brandon Bobcats are the athletic teams that represent Brandon University in Brandon, Manitoba, Canada. Currently, there are six Bobcat teams competing in U Sports as members of the Canada West Universities Athletic Association while the Bobcat soccer teams participate in the Manitoba Colleges Athletic Conference.

== History ==
Originally known as the Caps and Cappettes, Brandon University Athletics adopted the nickname Bobcats in 1969. Brandon University Athletics once fielded teams in football, field hockey, tennis, badminton, judo, swimming, and ice hockey. The men's ice hockey team ceased in 2002.

Brandon College and Brandon University athletes competed in the Western Intercollegiate Athletic Association from 1920 until it was split into two divisions in 1971, at which time the Bobcats joined the Great Plains Athletic Conference. Following the 1998 season, GPAC merged with the Canada West conference, the conference in which the Bobcats have been competing since.

== Teams ==
All teams competing in U Sports except where indicates:

| Men's sports | Women's sports |
|---|---|
| Basketball | Basketball |
| Curling | Curling |
| Soccer^{1} | Soccer^{1} |
| Volleyball | Volleyball |
^{1} – competes in the Canadian Collegiate Athletic Association (CCAA).

=== Men's basketball ===
- Coach: Gil Cheung
- Assistant Coach: Brett Nohr
- Assistant Coach: Keith Van Walleghem
- Assistant Coach: Kevin Phillip
- National Championships: 1987, 1988, 1989, 1996
- Canada West Championships: 2002
- GPAC Championships: 1980, 1981, 1982, 1983, 1984, 1987, 1988, 1989, 1990, 1991, 1993, 1995, 1996, 1997, 1998

The Bobcats men's basketball team is a 4-time Canadian University national championship winner, and one of only three Canadian universities to win three-consecutive men's basketball national championships. The Bobcats won titles in 1987, 1988, 1989, and 1996. The school's first national championship came on March 22, 1987. The Bobcats entered the tournament ranked #1 before beating the UBC Thunderbirds 74–66 in the gold medal final.

At the 1988 national championship tournament, the Bobcats defeated the Western Mustangs in the semi-final thanks to 21 points and seven rebounds from Partick Jebbison, before beating the Acadia Axemen 81–68 in the gold medal game on March 20, 1988.

The Bobcats successfully made it three national championships in a row in 1989. Entering the tournament ranked #1, the Bobcats beat the Toronto Varsity Blues 85–73 in the semi-final behind 18 second-half points from Joey Vickery before Brandon beat the Victoria Vikes 74–73.

In 1996 the Bobcats made it back to the national championship final after wins over the Acadia Axemen and Toronto Varsity Blues, setting up a gold medal game against the University of Alberta Golden Bears. The Bobcats were led by fifth-year forward Keith Vassell as he helped the Bobcats to a 79–72 win in what would be his final game after an outstanding playing career.

In the 1999–00 season, the Bobcats were silver medal winners after dropping the final to St. Francis Xavier X-Men in a hard-fought 61–60 loss. The following year saw a rematch of the previous year's national championship final between Brandon and St. Francis Xavier. The game went to overtime where StFX eventually came away with an 83–76 win.

In 2001–02, the Bobcats won a bronze medal thanks to a 69–63 win over the Victoria Vikes.

In the 2006–07 academic year, the Bobcats basketball team advanced to the Canadian Basketball Finals. They placed second to the Carleton Ravens, in a hard-fought 52–49 game.

==== Alumni ====
- Mike Vaira
- Dave Bauman
- Keith Streiter
- Jude Kelly
- Jerry Abernathy
- Brian Pallister
- Fred Lee
- Patrick Jebbison
- John Carson
- Whitney Dabney
- Dave Dominique
- Joey Vickery
- Dave Nackoney
- Keith Vassell
- Earnest Bell
- O'Neil Gordon
- Dany Charlery
- Chad Jacobson
- Scott Lelievre
- Adam Hartman
- Mario Joseph
- Yul Michel
- Gil Cheung
- Charlton Weasel Head

=== Women's basketball ===
- Head coach: James Bambury
- Assistant coach: Juan Diego Mosquera
- Assistant coach: Jaime Taggert

The Bobcats women's basketball team has competed in the Canada West conference since the 1999–00 season. Prior to joining Canada West, the Lady Bobcats were members of the Great Plains Athletics Conference from 1978 to 1999.

Members of the Lady Bobcats women's basketball team have earned Academic All-Canadian status 45 times since 1989. Bobcat Hall of Famer Janet Lumsden played for Brandon University from 1980 to 1984 and still holds multiple school records including career points (1,573) and points per game for one season (23.7 ppg in 1981–82).

Lumsden and fellow Lady Cat Sandra Hamilton are both inductees in the Manitoba Basketball Hall of Fame. Hamilton was named CIAU All-Canadian, GPAC MVP, and CIS Outstanding Player of the Year runner-up in 1991–92.

==== Alumni ====
- Janet Lumsden
- Sandra Hamilton
- Tracy Macleod

=== Men's volleyball ===
- Head coach: Grant Wilson
- Assistant coach: Ed Zalusky
- Assistant coach: Pat Thompson
- Assistant coach: Brendan White
- Assistant coach: Dan Boutwell
- Assistant coach: Mason Metcalf

Formed in 2005–06, the Bobcats men's volleyball team has risen from humble beginnings to a perennial nationally ranked team in U Sports. The Bobcats have made the Canada West playoffs every year since the 2007–08 season.

The Bobcats have qualified for the U Sports national championship tournament twice. The first appearance was in 2009 where they earned a bronze medal. In 2011, the Bobcats earned a spot in their first ever national championship final. They dropped a hard-fought match to eventual winner Trinity Western Spartans at their home gym.

For the 2012–13 season, the Bobcats finished in sixth place in the regular season with a 13–9 record, but excelled in the playoffs and won their first Canada West championship in a victory over the Manitoba Bisons. The team advanced to the 2013 national championships where they finished with a bronze medal after defeating the Western Mustangs.

In 2019, they took home the Canada West championship, their second conference title, beating Trinity Western three sets to two. In the national tournament, the Bobcats defeated the Carabins and the Golden Bears to advance to the championship game, but were defeated by the Spartans in a rematch, losing three sets to none.

The Bobcats have had two players win the League MVP Award, with Paul Sanderson winning in 2010 and Elliot Viles winning in 2019.

The Bobcats won the 2025 U Sports Men's Volleyball Championship after entering the tournament as the hosts and eighth seed, earning the first national championship in program history.

==== Alumni ====
- Joel Small
- Andrew Korol
- Paul Sanderson
- Kevin Miller
- Elliot Viles
- James Weir
- Robin Baghdady
- Mason Metcalf
- Reece Dixon
- Brady Nault
- Seth Friesen

==== Career Records ====
- Kills - 1357 Paul Sanderson
- Assists - 3248 Reece Dixon
- Service Aces - 144 Paul Sanderson
- Digs - 868 Jeremy Davies
- Blocks - 390 Mason Metcalf
- Points - 1574 Paul Sanderson

=== Women's volleyball ===
- Head coach: Lee Carter
- Assistant coach: Kevin Neufeld
- Assistant coach: Shane Smith
- Assistant coach: Andrew Korol
- Assistant coach: Lisa Whyte

The Bobcats women's volleyball team joined Canada West in the 2005–06 season.

Former Bobcats are in the Canada West record books. Teagan Hunter ranks in career kills (1,006), Becky Young is second all-time in career assists (3,338) and Erin Visch-Krahn is among all-time in career blocks (271). In the 2015–16 season, Shanlee McLennan set the Canada West record for career aces.

Following the 2010–11 season Meaghan Robertson was named to the CIS all-rookie team, Hunter was named second team all-Canadian, and German import player Donata Huebert was named CIS libero of the year.

==== Alumni ====
- Erin Visch-Krahn
- Ashley Creighton
- Teagan Hunter
- Becky Young
- Donata Huebert

== Former teams ==
=== Ice hockey ===
The Bobcats, and previously the Caps, ice hockey team was at one point the centrepiece of Brandon University Athletics. Records show Brandon College having both men's and women's hockey teams as early as 1910. Arguably the most successful ice hockey program was under head coach (and former player) Andy Murray, who in the 1980–81 season led the Bobcats to a 23–1 regular season record, a No. 1 national ranking and a berth in the national championship.

==== Alumni ====
- Mike Johnston
- Don Raleigh
- Frank McKinnon
- Andy Murray
- Merv Tweed
- Tim Lenardon
- Peter Gerlinger

=== Football ===
Re-introduced to Brandon College in 1950 under the leadership of Coach Al Tyler and Athletic Director "Curly" Tyler, the football team folded following the 1972–73 season, coached at that time by former Athletic Director and Manitoba Sports Hall of Fame inductee Doug Steeves at the time the program ceased.

==== Alumni ====
- Andy Murray
- Dave Bauman
- Rick Borotsik
