= U Sports men's volleyball =

Canadian university volleyball league

- Formerly: CIAU Volleyball; CIS Volleyball
- Sport: Volleyball
- Founded: 1966
- No. of teams: 31, in four conferences
- Country: Canada
- Most recent champion: Trinity Western Spartans (2026)
- Most titles: Manitoba Bisons (10); Winnipeg Wesmen (10); Alberta Golden Bears (10)
- Related competitions: U Sports Volleyball Championship
- Website: usports.ca/en/sports/volleyball/m

U Sports men's volleyball is the highest level of amateur play of men's indoor volleyball in Canada and operates under the auspices of U Sports (formerly Canadian Interuniversity Sport). Thirty-one teams from Canadian universities are divided into three athletic conferences, drawing from the three of the four regional associations of U Sports: Canada West Universities Athletic Association (CW), Ontario University Athletics (OUA), and Réseau du sport étudiant du Québec (RSEQ). The Atlantic University Sport (AUS) formerly featured men's volleyball as a U Sports championship sport, but it was removed following the 2017–18 season. The 31 participating teams compete in a regular season and following intra-conference playoffs, eight teams are selected to play in a national tournament to compete for the U Sports men's volleyball championship.

== Brief history ==
Men's university volleyball can be traced back to the 1950s when teams like the Alberta Golden Bears would play organized matches against other schools in the Western Canadian Intercollegiate Athletic Association (WCIAA). The Atlantic Intercollegiate Athletic Association (AIAA) first awarded a conference championship in men's volleyball in 1961 with the Acadia Axemen being the conference's first dominant presence. The Ontario-Quebec Athletic Association (O-QAA) first awarded a conference title to the Toronto Varsity Blues which came in the 1965–66 season.

The CIAU organized the first national championship tournament which was held in Calgary, Alberta in 1967 and featured the UBC Thunderbirds defeating the Mount Allison Mounties and then the Sherbrooke Vert et Or in the championship match to be named the first national champions.

In 1971, Quebec universities made the decision to restrict conference competition to within their own province and the Quebec Universities Athletic Association was created, leaving the O-QAA to be renamed the Ontario Universities Athletic Association (OUAA). Teams were further sub-divided in 1972 in the WCIAA, with the Manitoba Bisons, Winnipeg Wesmen, and Regina Cougars playing in the separate Great Plains Athletic Association (later renamed Great Plains Athletic Conference (GPAC)) while the remaining teams from Alberta and British Columbia played in the Canada West Universities Athletic Association (CWUAA). The GPAC and CWUAA combined back into one conference starting in the 2001–02 season.

The members of the Atlantic University Sport (AUS) conference (formerly the MIAA) had seen a reduction over the years and would play regular season inter-conference games with the Réseau du sport étudiant du Québec (RSEQ, formerly QUAA). The Memorial Sea-Hawks discontinued their men's volleyball program after the 2016–17 season, leaving the AUS with only two teams, which was below the three-team league minimum for a varsity sport. After a transition year, the Dalhousie Tigers and UNB Reds joined the RSEQ, resulting in the AUS conference's exit from men's volleyball. The 2020 championship tournament and the entire 2020–21 season were cancelled due to the COVID-19 pandemic.

== Season structure ==
=== Exhibition season ===
To prepare for the season, teams will typically play a series of exhibition games against conference and non-conference opponents. These games are usually played in September and/or October before the regular season and in December and/or January during the holiday break. In 2019, the Can Am Volleyball Holiday Showcase was created which featured eight teams from across North America, including those competing in the NCAA. The 2019 tournament featured four U Sports teams and four NCAA teams, including the defending U Sports national champion Trinity Western Spartans and the NCAA national champion Long Beach State Beach.

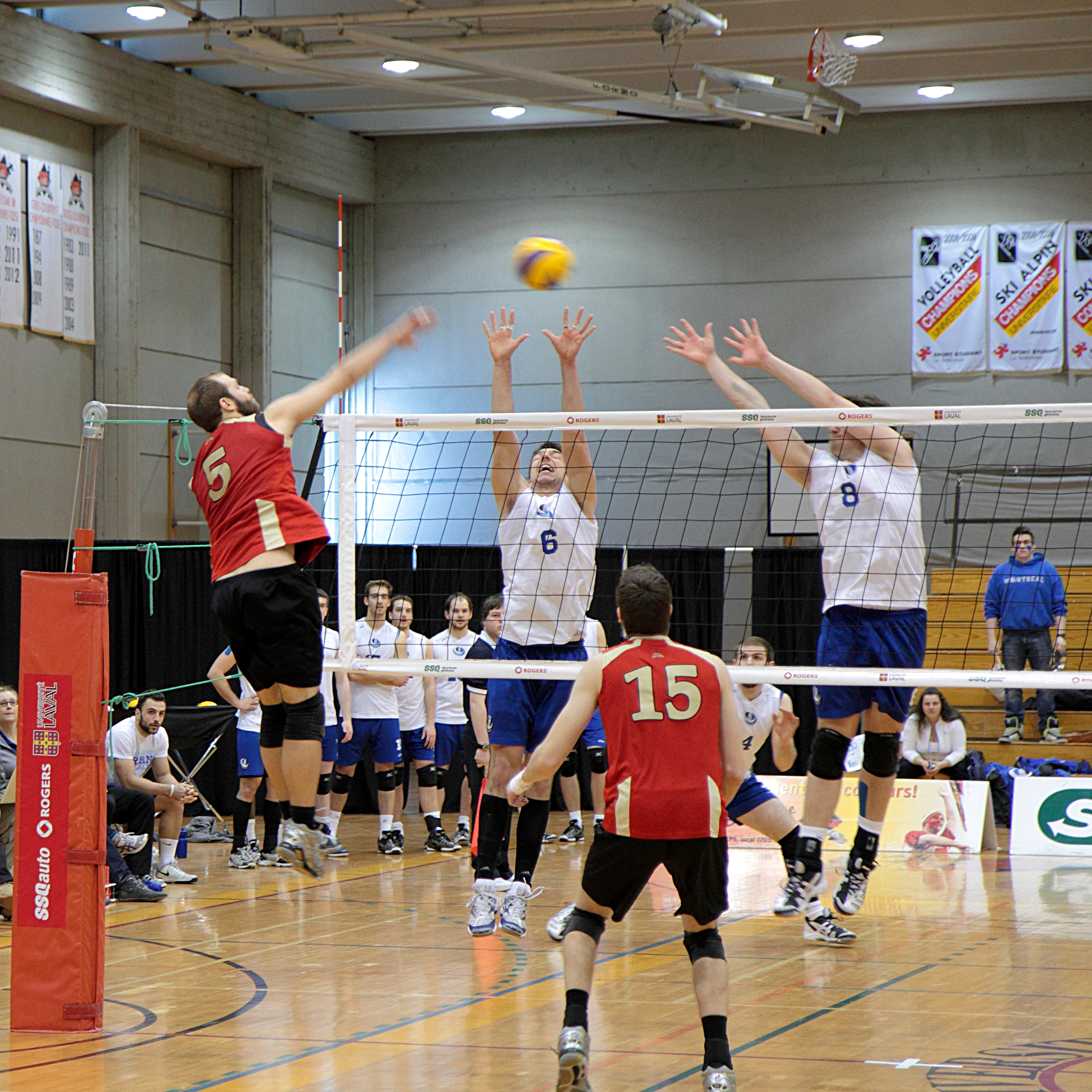
The Laval Rouge et Or play against the Montreal Carabins at PEPS in 2013.

=== Regular season ===
As of the 2022-23 season, the RSEQ begin their season first, on the second Friday of October. The Canada West conference begins play one week later and the OUA conference begins their season on the first weekend of November. All regular season games are in-conference and the schedule ends in approximately mid-February.

In the RSEQ conference, the five teams play against each opponent four times (twice home and twice away) for a total of 16 regular season games. In the OUA, the 13 teams play against ten different opponents twice, for a total of 20 games. The OUA previously had two divisions, but moved to singular conference play beginning with the 2022-23 season. Canada West has adopted the same format to the OUA, where 13 teams play against ten opponents twice, for a total of 20 games.

Following the conclusion of the regular season, the best player in U Sports Men's volleyball is given the Player of the Year Award. An award is also given to the Rookie of the Year and the Dale Iwanoczko Award is given to the best well-rounded student (volleyball, academics and community involvement). An award was also given for the Libero of the Year, but it was discontinued after the 2014–15 season.

=== Playoffs ===
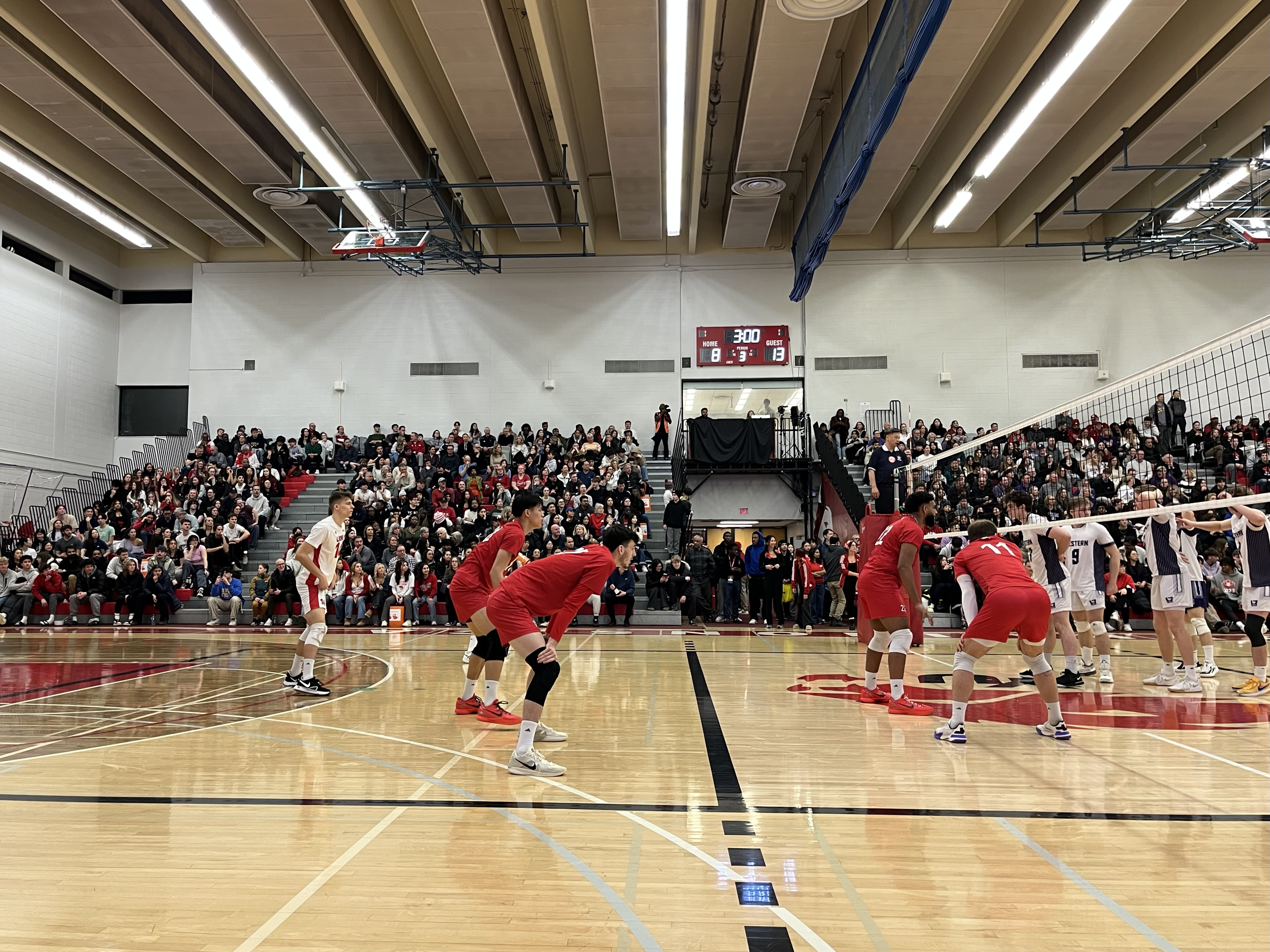
The York Lions hosting the Western Mustangs in 2025.

After the regular season, playoff games and series are held between the top teams in each conference to determine conference champions. In the RSEQ, the top four teams qualify for the playoffs and play a best-of-three series in the semi-finals and in the conference championship. In Canada West, the top eight teams qualify for the playoffs and play best-of-three series in playoff brackets in the quarterfinals. The winners of these series play in best-of-three semifinals until two teams remain where they play in a single elimination conference championship game.

The OUA is the only conference that features a single elimination format in all playoff games. Teams are seeded one through eight and advance to the semi-finals in a bracket format with the higher-seeded team hosting each game. The highest-seeded remaining team hosts the conference championship, the Forsyth Cup.

=== National championship ===
The U Sports men's volleyball championship was introduced for the 1966–67 season to determine a national champion for the CIAU. A predetermined host university stages the eight-team tournament over three days and finals games are played on the last day to award gold, silver, and bronze medals. The host team is automatically qualified for the tournament, as are each of the conference champions. Four other teams are entered based on the strength of their conferences and their post-season finishes. The Manitoba Bisons, Alberta Golden Bears, and Winnipeg Wesmen have won the most championships with 10 gold medals won apiece, although the Bisons have won the most medals overall (25 for Manitoba, 22 for Alberta, and 15 for Winnipeg). Quebec City has hosted the most championships with 12 which were all hosted by Université Laval (most recently in 2019). The national championship has historically been dominated by the Canada West conference with those teams winning 50 of the 57 championship matches as of the 2024–25 season. The OUA and AUS have never had a national men's volleyball champion. The 2020 championship tournament and the 2020–21 season were cancelled due to the COVID-19 pandemic.

== Teams ==
=== Membership ===
The AUS conference had featured three teams following the exit of the Moncton Aigles Bleus in 2006 and featured inter-conference matches with the RSEQ. The RSEQ had also been reduced to three teams in 2011 after McGill disbanded their men's program. The Memorial Sea-Hawks folded their program after the 2016–17 season, leaving the AUS with one team short of the three-team minimum for a varsity league. However, the AUS allowed Dalhousie and UNB to play a transitional season before joining the RSEQ as full members for the 2018–19 season.

Conversely, the Canada West conference added teams with the UBCO Heat joining in 2011–12, Mount Royal Cougars in 2012–13, and MacEwan Griffins in 2014–15. While the Regina Cougars program was cut following the 2017–18 season, the Fraser Valley Cascades volleyball program was granted membership for the 2020–21 season which was deferred to the 2021–22 season. Following the return of Simon Fraser University to U Sports, the Red Leafs will start a men's volleyball program that will begin play in the 2027–28 season.

31 teams competed in the 2025–26 season.

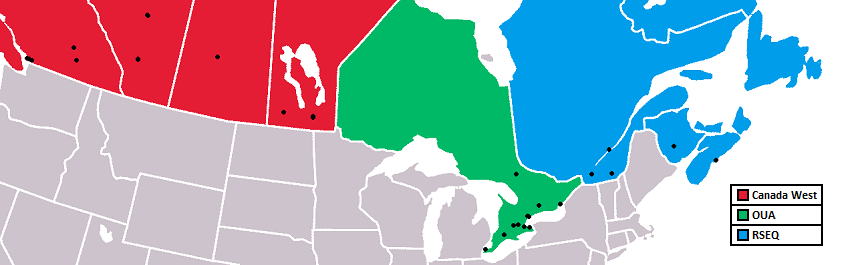

=== Canada West ===
| University | Varsity Name | City | Province | Arena | CWC | NC |
|---|---|---|---|---|---|---|
| University of British Columbia | Thunderbirds | Vancouver | BC | War Memorial Gymnasium | 5 | 4 |
| Trinity Western University | Spartans | Langley | BC | Langley Events Centre | 8 | 8 |
| University of the Fraser Valley | Cascades | Abbotsford | BC | Envision Athletic Centre | 0 | 0 |
| Thompson Rivers University | WolfPack | Kamloops | BC | Tournament Capital Centre | 0 | 0 |
| University of British Columbia Okanagan | Heat | Kelowna | BC | UBC Okanagan Gymnasium | 0 | 0 |
| University of Calgary | Dinos | Calgary | AB | Jack Simpson Gymnasium | 9 | 4 |
| Mount Royal University | Cougars | Calgary | AB | Kenyon Court | 0 | 0 |
| University of Alberta | Golden Bears | Edmonton | AB | Saville Community Sports Centre | 15 | 10 |
| MacEwan University | Griffins | Edmonton | AB | Dr. David W. Atkinson Gymnasium | 0 | 0 |
| University of Saskatchewan | Huskies | Saskatoon | SK | Physical Activity Complex | 10 | 4 |
| Brandon University | Bobcats | Brandon | MB | Healthy Living Centre | 2 | 1 |
| University of Manitoba | Bisons | Winnipeg | MB | Investors Group Athletic Centre | 2 | 10 |
| University of Winnipeg | Wesmen | Winnipeg | MB | Duckworth Centre | 1 | 10 |

- Note: Conference titles won by teams in the Great Plains Athletic Conference (1972–73 season to 2000–01 season) are not included in the above table due to lack of information on this conference.

=== Ontario University Athletics ===
| University | Varsity Name | City | Province | Arena | OC | NC |
|---|---|---|---|---|---|---|
| University of Windsor | Lancers | Windsor | ON | St. Denis Centre | 1 | 0 |
| University of Western Ontario | Mustangs | London | ON | Alumni Hall | 5 | 0 |
| University of Waterloo | Warriors | Waterloo | ON | Physical Activities Complex | 4 | 0 |
| University of Guelph | Gryphons | Guelph | ON | Guelph Gryphons Athletic Centre | 1 | 0 |
| McMaster University | Marauders | Hamilton | ON | Burridge Gymnasium | 12 | 0 |
| Brock University | Badgers | St. Catharines | ON | Bob Davis Gymnasium | 0 | 0 |
| Nipissing University | Lakers | North Bay | ON | Robert J. Surtees Student Athletics Centre | 0 | 0 |
| York University | Lions | Toronto | ON | Tait McKenzie Centre | 9 | 0 |
| University of Toronto | Varsity Blues | Toronto | ON | Goldring Centre | 15 | 0 |
| Toronto Metropolitan University | Bold | Toronto | ON | Mattamy Athletic Centre | 0 | 0 |
| Trent University | Excalibur | Peterborough | ON | Trent Athletics Centre | 0 | 0 |
| Queen's University | Gaels | Kingston | ON | Athletics & Recreation Centre | 8 | 0 |
| Royal Military College of Canada | Paladins | Kingston | ON | SAM Gym | 0 | 0 |

=== Réseau du sport étudiant du Québec ===
| University | Varsity Name | City | Province | Arena | CC | NC |
|---|---|---|---|---|---|---|
| Université de Montréal | Carabins | Montreal | QC | CEPSUM | 5 | 1 |
| Université Laval | Rouge et Or | Quebec City | QC | PEPS gymnase | 35 | 4 |
| Université de Sherbrooke | Vert et Or | Sherbrooke | QC | Centre sportif Yvon-Lamarche | 14 | 1 |
| University of New Brunswick | Reds | Fredericton | NB | Richard J Currie Centre | 9 | 0 |
| Dalhousie University | Tigers | Halifax | NS | Dalplex Fieldhouse | 36 | 0 |

- Note: The UNB Reds and Dalhousie Tigers moved from the AUS to the RSEQ starting with the 2018–19 season.
