= Ron Talakoski =

Canadian ice hockey player

- Born: June 1, 1962 Thunder Bay, Ontario, Canada
- Died: July 6, 2009 (aged 47) Thunder Bay, Ontario, Canada
- Height: 6 ft 3 in (191 cm)
- Weight: 220 lb (100 kg; 15 st 10 lb)
- Position: Right wing
- Shot: Right
- Played for: New York Rangers
- NHL draft: Undrafted
- Playing career: 1986–1996

Ronald Paul Isaac Talakoski (June 1, 1962 – July 6, 2009) was a Canadian professional ice hockey right winger who played nine games in the National Hockey League with the New York Rangers between 1986 and 1988.

== Biography ==
Talakoski spent four years at the University of Manitoba. In October, 1986 he signed as a free agent with the New York Rangers and played three games for the club that season. The rest of his rookie pro year was spent in the AHL and IHL. In 1987-88 he played a half dozen games for the Blueshirts then scored 24 goals for the IHL's Colorado Rangers before retiring. Talakoski also served as a firefighter in Thunder Bay, Ontario for 18 years. Talakoski was found dead by Thunder Bay Fire and Rescue Services after a short search near Pier 3 in Thunder Bay, after having been reported missing from his residence. He is reported to have suffered from Shy–Drager syndrome.

== Career statistics ==
=== Regular season and playoffs ===
			Regular season					Playoffs
Season	Team	League	GP	G	A	Pts	PIM	GP	G	A	Pts	PIM
1979–80	Thunder Bay North Stars	TBJHL	34	20	24	44	24	—	—	—	—	—
1980–81	Thunder Bay North Stars	TBJHL	—	—	—	—	—	—	—	—	—	—
1981–82	University of Manitoba	CIAU	—	—	—	—	—	—	—	—	—	—
1982–83	University of Manitoba	CIAU	31	12	11	23	51	—	—	—	—	—
1984–85	University of Manitoba	CIAU	11	4	4	8	77	—	—	—	—	—
1986–87	New York Rangers	NHL	3	0	0	0	21	—	—	—	—	—
1986–87	New Haven Nighthawks	AHL	26	2	2	4	58	1	0	0	0	0
1986–87	Flint Spirits	IHL	3	2	1	3	12	—	—	—	—	—
1987–88	New York Rangers	NHL	6	0	1	1	12	—	—	—	—	—
1987–88	Colorado Rangers	IHL	62	24	19	43	104	10	1	4	5	17
1988–89	Thunder Bay Twins	NHNO	—	—	—	—	—	—	—	—	—	—
1992–93	Thunder Bay Twins	NHNO	—	—	—	—	—	—	—	—	—	—
1993–94	Thunder Bay Senators	CoHL	43	19	20	39	51	9	7	3	10	0
1995–96	Thunder Bay Senators	CoHL	8	1	1	2	13	15	2	1	3	8
NHL totals			9	0	1	1	33	—	—	—	—	—
