= Tim Lenardon =

Canadian retired ice hockey centre (born 1962)

- Born: May 11, 1962 (age 63) Trail, British Columbia, Canada
- Height: 6 ft 2 in (188 cm)
- Weight: 185 lb (84 kg; 13 st 3 lb)
- Position: Centre
- Shot: Left
- Played for: New Jersey Devils; Vancouver Canucks
- NHL draft: Undrafted
- Playing career: 1986–1993

Timothy Norman Lenardon (born May 11, 1962) is a Canadian former professional ice hockey centre who played 15 games in the National Hockey League for the New Jersey Devils and Vancouver Canucks between 1986 and 1990. Lenardon spent the rest of his career mainly in the minor American Hockey League and International Hockey League, retiring in 1993. He currently serves on the scouting staff of the Vancouver Canucks.

== Playing career ==
Lenardon played for the Trail Smoke Eaters and played Canadian college hockey at the University of Brandon. Never drafted, he signed as a free agent with the New Jersey Devils after leaving school in 1986. Assigned to the AHL, he proved to be a quality scorer at that level, recording 63 points in 61 games in the 1986–87 campaign, and earned a 7-game NHL callup to New Jersey, where he recorded a goal and an assist.

Despite putting up impressive numbers in the minors, Lenardon never received another NHL shot in two more seasons in the Devils' system, and was dealt to the Vancouver Canucks for Claude Vilgrain at the trade deadline in 1989. Lenardon would get his second NHL stint in the 1989–90 season, appearing in 8 games for the Canucks and scoring a goal.

After being released by Vancouver, Lenardon spent a season playing in Italy before signing with the Minnesota North Stars in 1991. He spent two more seasons playing in the minors in Minnesota's system before retiring in 1993. In 15 career NHL games, he recorded 2 goals and an assist for 3 points.

== Post-playing career ==
Lenardon currently serves as an amateur scout for the Vancouver Canucks.

== Career statistics ==
=== Regular season and playoffs ===
			Regular season					Playoffs
Season	Team	League	GP	G	A	Pts	PIM	GP	G	A	Pts	PIM
1979–80	Trail Smoke Eaters	KIJHL	30	21	35	56	—	—	—	—	—	—
1980–81	Trail Smoke Eaters	KIJHL	40	49	60	109	—	—	—	—	—	—
1981–82	Trail Smoke Eaters	KIJHL	40	78	61	139	—	—	—	—	—	—
1982–83	Trail Smoke Eaters	KIJHL	38	86	86	172	—	—	—	—	—	—
1983–84	Brandon University	CIAU	24	22	21	43	36	—	—	—	—	—
1984–85	Brandon University	CIAU	24	20	39	59	42	—	—	—	—	—
1985–86	Brandon University	CIAU	28	27	40	67	54	—	—	—	—	—
1986–87	New Jersey Devils	NHL	7	1	1	2	0	—	—	—	—	—
1986–87	Maine Mariners	AHL	61	28	35	63	30	—	—	—	—	—
1987–88	Utica Devils	AHL	79	38	53	91	72	—	—	—	—	—
1988–89	Utica Devils	AHL	63	28	27	55	48	—	—	—	—	—
1988–89	Milwaukee Admirals	IHL	15	6	5	11	27	10	2	3	5	25
1989–90	Vancouver Canucks	NHL	8	1	0	1	4	—	—	—	—	—
1989–90	Milwaukee Admirals	IHL	66	32	36	68	134	6	1	1	2	4
1990–91	Fiemme Cavalese	ITA	36	23	28	51	50	10	8	18	26	0
1991–92	Kalamazoo Wings	IHL	73	27	24	51	37	12	5	5	10	4
1992–93	Kalamazoo Wings	IHL	60	12	18	30	56	—	—	—	—	—
AHL totals			203	94	115	209	150	—	—	—	—	—
IHL totals			214	77	83	160	254	—	—	—	—	—
NHL totals			15	2	1	3	4	—	—	—	—	—
