= Wayne Fleming =

- Born: July 6, 1950 Snow Lake, Manitoba, Canada
- Died: March 25, 2013 (aged 62) Calgary, Alberta, Canada
- Coached for: Edmonton Oilers; Calgary Flames; Philadelphia Flyers; Phoenix Coyotes; New York Islanders; Avangard Omsk; EV Landshut; EHC Kloten; Leksands IF
- Coaching career: 1980–2013

Wayne Fleming (July 6, 1950 – March 25, 2013) was a Canadian ice hockey coach. He served as assistant coach in the National Hockey League (NHL) for the Edmonton Oilers, Calgary Flames, Philadelphia Flyers, Phoenix Coyotes, New York Islanders and Tampa Bay Lightning. He also served as a head coach for Leksands IF, EV Landshut and Avangard Omsk in Europe, and as both assistant and head coach for Team Canada in international tournaments.

== Coaching career ==
Fleming began his coaching career in 1980 with the University of Manitoba Bisons. He spent nine seasons with the Bisons and was named the Canadian Interuniversity Athletic Union Coach of the Year in 1985. From 1992 until 1996, he was the head coach of Leksands IF of the Swedish Elitserien. He then coached the Landshut Cannibals in Germany for one year before returning to North America to become an assistant coach with the New York Islanders in 1997. He then served as assistant coach with the Edmonton Oilers under Pat Quinn. On July 23, 2010, it was announced that Fleming had signed with the Tampa Bay Lightning as their assistant coach.

Internationally, Fleming joined the Canadian Olympic team in 1990 as its general manager and assistant coach, and won a silver medal at the 1992 Winter Olympics. He returned to the national program in 2000 when he was named the vice president, hockey by Hockey Canada and served as an associate coach for the national team as it won a gold medal at the 2002 Winter Olympics and the 2004 World Cup of Hockey.

Fleming died of brain cancer on March 25, 2013, at the age of 62, at his home in Calgary.
