= Max Bell Centre (Winnipeg) =

Building in Manitoba, Canada

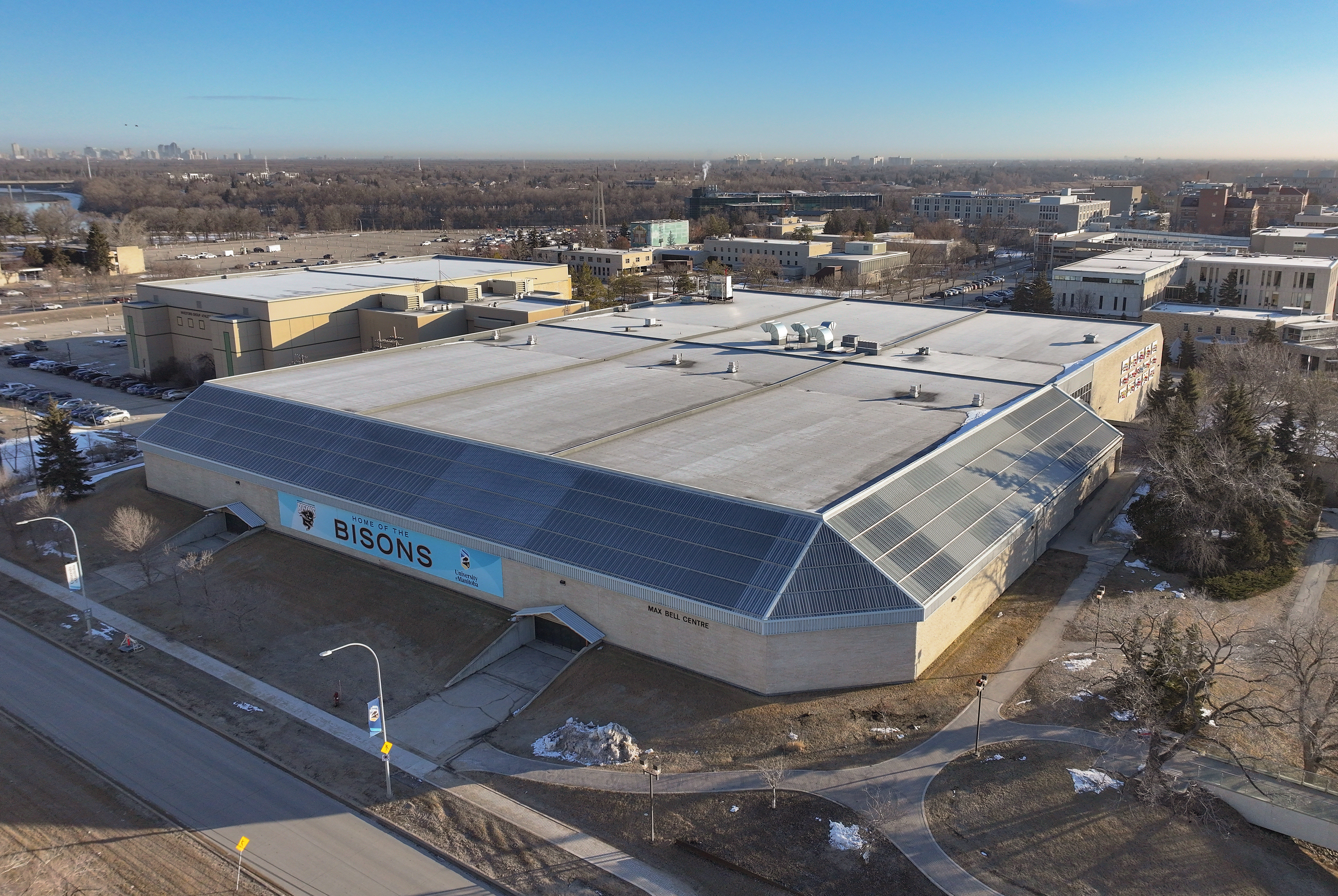

- Location within Manitoba Location within Canada
- Location: 109 Sidney Smith Street; Winnipeg, Manitoba; R3T 2M6
- Coordinates: 49°48′33″N 97°8′23″W
- Owner: University of Manitoba
- Capacity: 1,600 (ice hockey); 1,350 (track and field)

Construction
- Opened: 1981

Tenants
- Manitoba Bisons (U Sports) (1981–present); Winnipeg Ice (WHL) (2019–2023)

The Max Bell Centre is a multipurpose athletic facility located on the University of Manitoba campus in Winnipeg, Manitoba, Canada. It is located across the street from IG Field and next to the Investors Group Athletic Centre. Inside the complex is the Wayne Fleming Arena as well as the James Daly Fieldhouse, an indoor track and fieldhouse.

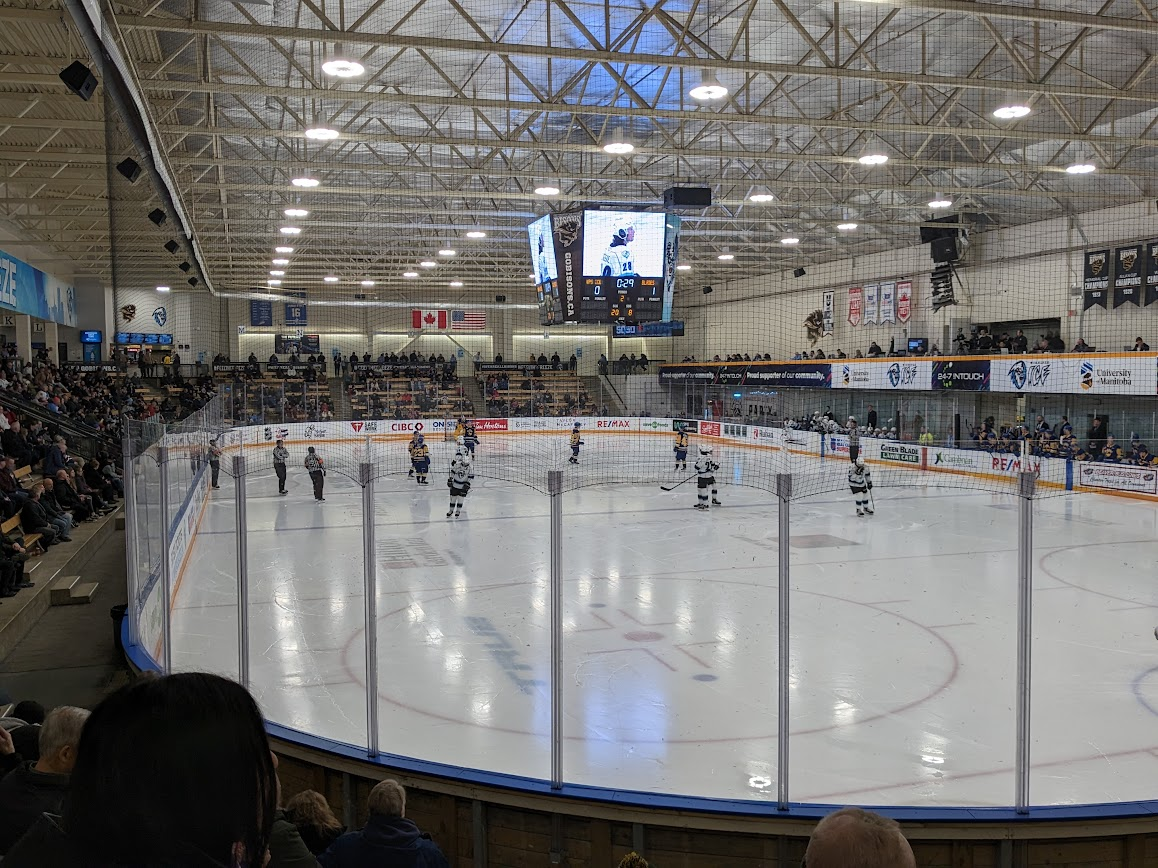
A game between the Winnipeg ICE and Saskatoon Blades of the Western Hockey League at the Wayne Fleming Arena in the Max Bell Centre on February 1, 2023.

The ice hockey arena is open year-round and has a seating capacity of 1,600. It is home to the University of Manitoba's Bisons men's and women's ice hockey teams and was also used as a venue for inline hockey during the 1999 Pan American Games. The arena also hosted the WHL team Winnipeg Ice from 2019 to 2023. Prior to the start of the 2019-2020 Western Hockey League regular season, seating capacity at Wayne Fleming Arena was increased from 1,400 to 1,600, with a new balcony added on the east side of the arena. The balcony includes Premium Loge Seating which provide patrons with an excellent elevated view of the ice surface. In addition, a Fort Garry Brewing Co. Party Lounge beneath the loge provides a close-up view of the action at ice level. As part of that expansion, a new centre-hung scoreboard with video replay capabilities was added, as well as additional food and beverage kiosks.

In 2021, a new energy-efficient ice plant was installed in the arena with funding from the Government of Canada and the University of Manitoba.

The fieldhouse features two tracks and a large multipurpose infield. It has a seating capacity of 1,350 for track meets and other sporting events. The fieldhouse hosts the University of Manitoba Bisons track and field team.

The complex is named after Canadian businessman and philanthropist Max Bell. The hockey arena portion of the complex is named in honour of the late Wayne Fleming. Fleming played for and coached the Bisons men's hockey team before moving onto a distinguished coaching career in professional hockey. The fieldhouse portion of the complex is named after the late James Morgan Cuthbert Daly who was an avid runner and coach in Winnipeg.
