= Duckworth Centre =

Athletics centre

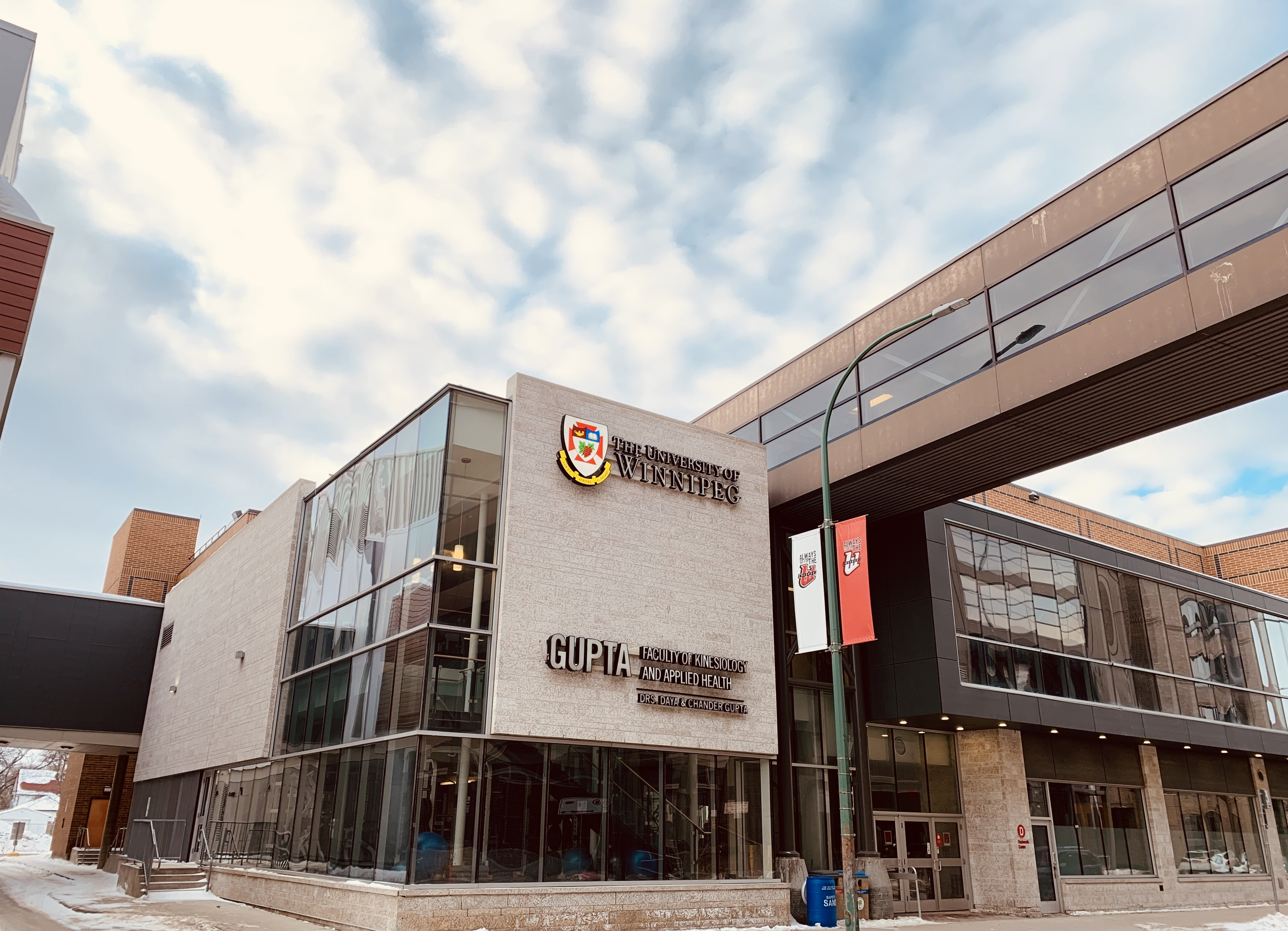
- Interactive map of Duckworth Centre
- Former names: University of Winnipeg Athletic Centre
- Address: 400 Spence Street; Winnipeg, Manitoba; R3B 2E9
- Coordinates: 49°53′32.5″N 97°09′16″W
- Owner: University of Winnipeg
- Operator: University of Winnipeg
- Capacity: 1,780

Construction
- Opened: September 14, 1984; 42 years ago

Tenant
- Winnipeg Wesmen

The Duckworth Centre is an arena and gym on the University of Winnipeg campus in downtown Winnipeg, Manitoba, Canada.

Constructed in 1983 and officially opened on September 14, 1984, it hosts the University's Winnipeg Wesmen basketball and volleyball games and has a listed seated capacity of 1,780 and a maximum capacity of 2,450 for convocations and conventions.

The facility is named after Henry Duckworth, a former University of Winnipeg administrator and an instrumental figure in the university's history.

The facility can expand to include three full-size basketball courts or one centre court with two sides of retractable bleachers. The Lea Marc Printing Corporate suite oversees the centre court and is used for housing sponsors and VIP seating.

Encircling the court is a 167-metre indoor running/walking track.

The facility also houses six racquetball/squash/handball courts, change rooms and saunas, as well as administrative offices and athletic therapy services.

In December 2018, a new Ring of Honour was commissioned and installed to recognize the important and most successful builders and athletes in Wesmen history. The inaugural class consisted of longtime women's basketball head coach Tom Kendall; point guard Sandra Carroll; longtime women's volleyball coach Mike Burchuk and current Wesmen head coach, and former all-star player, Diane Scott.

The Duckworth Centre also houses the Bill Wedlake Fitness Centre, named after the former basketball coach and administrator.

In 2019, it hosted the Men's NORCECA Volleyball Championship tournament.
