= UFV Athletic Centre =

Athletics facility in Canada

- Interactive map of UFV Athletic Centre
- Coordinates: 49°1′38″N 122°17′4″W
- Owner: University of the Fraser Valley
- Capacity: 1,500 (basketball, volleyball, wrestling)

Construction
- Opened: 2007

Tenant
- Fraser Valley Cascades

UFV Athletic Centre (formerly Envision Athletic Centre) is a 21,500-square-foot (2,000 m^{2}) multi-purpose athletics facility on the campus of the University of the Fraser Valley in Abbotsford, British Columbia, Canada.

The main south gymnasium opened in 2007 and has retractable bleachers with a seating capacity of 1,500. It hosts the university of the Fraser Valley Cascades basketball, volleyball, and wrestling teams. The facility also features a smaller north gym with seating for 350 spectators.
