= Winnipeg Wesmen =

University of Winnipeg athletic teams

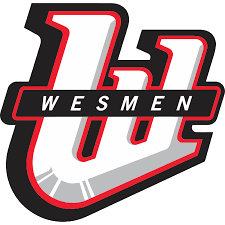
- University: University of Winnipeg
- Nickname: Wesmen
- Association: U Sports
- Conference: Canada West
- Athletic director: Cara Isaak
- Location: Winnipeg, Manitoba
- Varsity teams: 10
- Arena: Duckworth Centre
- Colours: Red, White, and Black
- Mascot: Wes Lee Coyote
- Website: wesmen.ca

The Winnipeg Wesmen are the athletic teams that represent the University of Winnipeg in Winnipeg, Manitoba, Canada. As an undergraduate school, the Wesmen participate in the sports of basketball, volleyball, and soccer in both the men's and women's divisions of U Sports. All home games are played at the Duckworth Centre, located on the university's downtown Winnipeg campus.

== History ==
The University of Winnipeg's athletic program has its roots in the intercollegiate sports teams that were formed in 1889 among Winnipeg schools. In 1962, the first professional Athletics Director, Blue Bomber player Ray Jauch, was appointed by United College. In 1963, the new Riddell Hall gymnasium was opened. In 1966, the United College Student Council held a public competition to name its sports team. The name chosen was Wesmen, which combined "Wesley" and "Manitoba".

In 1967, after the University of Winnipeg was incorporated, the Wesmen began competing across Canada with other University teams across Canada as a member of two sports governing bodies: the Western Intercollegiate Athletic Association and the Canadian Interuniversity Athletic Union. The main sports included were basketball, volleyball, and hockey (although hockey was not continued after 1984). The Wesmen also hosted tournaments, including the Wesmen Classic, which was previously known as the Golden Boy Classic (1967–1976).

In 1984, the Athletics Centre was opened at the University of Winnipeg. In 1992, the building was renamed as the Duckworth Centre in honour of Henry Duckworth, a past University President. In 2008, the Bill Wedlake Fitness Centre was added to the building. Most recently, the Axworthy Health and RecPlex, an adjoining fieldhouse for soccer and sports education, was built.

The Athletic Directors have been: Ray Jauch, from 1962 to 1964; Edward Vidruk, from 1964 to 1966; David Anderson, from 1966–1984; Glen Conly, 1973 (he covered David Anderson during a leave of absence); Aubrey Ferris, from 1984 to 2000; Bill Wedlake, from 2000 to 2008; Doran Reid, from 2009–2015; Dave Crook, from 2015 to 2024; and since 2024, Cara Isaak.

== Varsity teams ==
Men's sports	Women's sports
Basketball	Basketball
Volleyball	Soccer
	Volleyball

== Former teams ==
=== Ice hockey ===
The team was active from 1967 until 1984 and played out of the Pioneer Arena, now known as the Charlie Gardiner Arena.

In 1972, the WCIAA was split in two, primarily as a way of cutting down on travel expenses. Winnipeg were founding members of the Great Plains Athletic Association (soon to be called Great Plains Athletic Conference) and finished as runners-up in the first two seasons of play. Unfortunately, that was the high water mark for the program. While there was some criticism of Tom Marshall's ability as coach, the team was hamstrung by its subpar (for the college level) rink and its lack of recruiting. After 1974, the team never finished higher than 4th in the standings and was often dead-last. With little hope for the foreseeable future, the university decided to suspend the program in 1984 and, as of 2024, it has yet to return.

=== Baseball ===
The Wesmen previously competed in men's baseball as a single-sport member of the National Association of Intercollegiate Athletics (NAIA) until the program was cut after the 2017 season.

== U Sports Championships ==
Volleyball has always been a popular sport in Manitoba and the University of Winnipeg Wesmen and University of Manitoba Bisons have frequently battled for the U Sports title. The Wesmen women hold the record with 7 national titles and were the first to win 6 consecutive titles between 1983 and 1988, this was a feat that was only later repeated once by the University of Alberta Pandas.

In recent years the men's volleyball side won the CIS championships for the 2006–07 season, defeating the University of Alberta 3 sets to 2, the following year in a rematch of the same final the Wesmen lost 3 sets to 1 finishing runner-up to Alberta this time.

In women's basketball the ladies made it to the national final against Simon Fraser in 2004–05 losing the final 60–50. The year before in the bronze medal match between the same two schools the Wesmen ladies won 65–62. In the mid 90s, women's Wesmen basketball was a national powerhouse. The team would go on to a 118-1 record in the span from 1992–1995, including 3 CIS national basketball championships and beating several NCAA Women's Division I programs in North American tournaments.

Sport	Nat. titles	Winning years	Conf. titles	Winning years	Ref.
Basketball (men's)	0		8	1979, 1980, 1987, 1992, 1993, 1994, 2023, 2024	
Basketball (women's)	3	1993, 1994, 1995	21	1977, 1978, 1979, 1980, 1981, 1982, 1983, 1984, 1986, 1987, 1989, 1991, 1992, 1993, 1994, 1995, 2002, 2003, 2004, 2005, 2022	
Volleyball (women's)	7	1983, 1984, 1985, 1986, 1987, 1988, 1993	15	1982, 1983, 1984, 1985, 1986, 1987, 1988, 1989, 1991, 1992, 1993, 1994, 1995, 1996, 2003	
Volleyball (men's)	10	1969, 1971, 1972, 1973, 1974, 1977, 1986, 1987, 1998, 2007	16	1986, 1987, 1988, 1990, 1992, 1993, 1994, 1996, 1997, 1998, 1999, 2000, 2002, 2007, 2008, 2009, 2025	
Curling (men's)	0		2	2015, 2018	
Total titles	20		62		

== Awards and honors ==
=== Canada West Hall of Fame ===
- Wesmen Women's Basketball Team (1992–95): Canada West Hall of Fame - 2020 Inductee
