= Investors Group Athletic Centre =

Sports venue in Winnipeg, Manitoba

- Interactive map of Investors Group Athletic Centre
- Location: Winnipeg, MB, CAN
- Coordinates: 49°48′33″N 97°8′23″W
- Owner: University of Manitoba
- Capacity: 3,100 (basketball/volleyball)

Construction
- Opened: 1999

Tenant
- Manitoba Bisons (U Sports) (1999-present)

The Investors Group Athletic Centre is a facility in Winnipeg that was constructed for the 1999 Pan-American Games. The 70,000-square-foot (6,500 m^{2}) building, located next to the Max Bell Centre and IG Field on the University of Manitoba campus, features seating area for over 3,000 spectators. The building serves as the permanent home of the Canadian national basketball and volleyball teams as well as the Manitoba Bisons basketball and volleyball teams.
