= Sherbrooke Vert et Or =

Université de Sherbrooke athletic teams

Sherbrooke Vert & Or
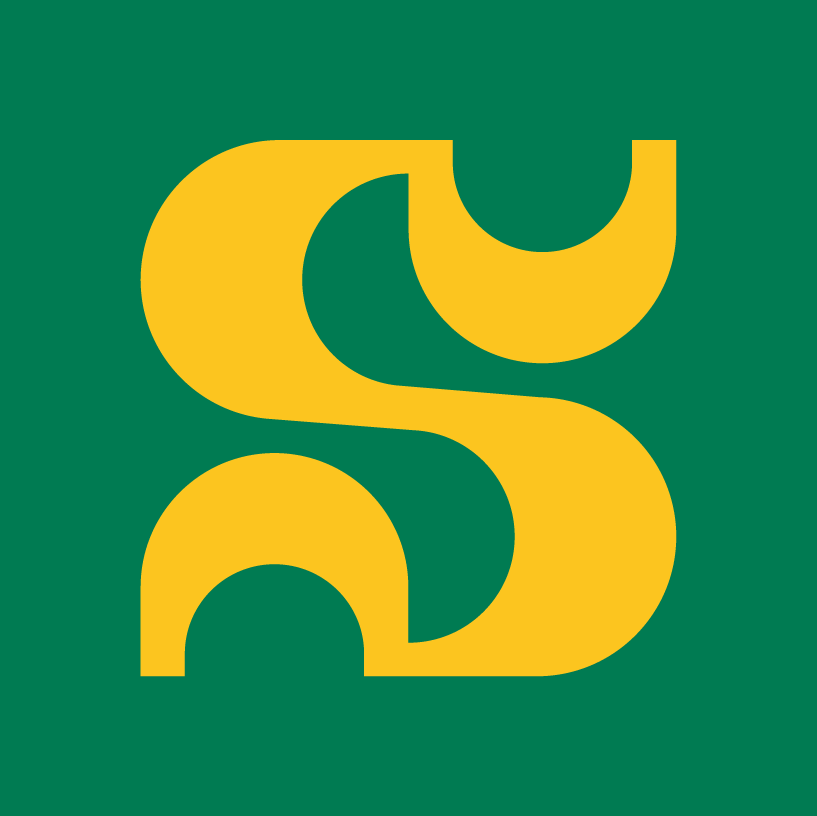
- University: Université de Sherbrooke
- Association: U Sports
- Conference: Réseau du sport étudiant du Québec
- Athletic director: Christian Gagnon
- Location: Sherbrooke, Quebec
- Football stadium: Stade de l'Université de Sherbrooke
- Sport pavilion: Pavillon Univestrie
- Nickname: Vert et Or, Green and Gold
- Colours: Green and Gold
- Website: www.usherbrooke.ca/sport/

The Sherbrooke Vert & Or (French: Vert-et-Or de Sherbrooke; "Sherbrooke Green & Gold") is the athletic teams that represent the Université de Sherbrooke in Sherbrooke, Quebec, Canada. The team plays in Réseau du sport étudiant du Québec (French for "Quebec Student Sports Network").

== Varsity teams ==
- Track and Field (M/W)
- Football (M)
- Cross Country (M/W)
- Badminton (M/W)
- Golf (M/W)
- Rugby (M/W)
- Soccer (M/W)
- Swimming (M/W)
- Volleyball (M/W)
- Cheerleading
- Ultimate (sport) (M/W)

== Football ==
The Sherbrooke Vert & Or U Sports football team began its second incarnation in 2003, thirty years after the first program was dropped in 1973. The Vert & Or first began to play in 1971 in the Quebec Universities Athletic Association, but only played for three seasons. The program was dropped after the 1973 season due to a shift in philosophy as many francophone universities placed an emphasis on community involvement and intramural athletic activities as opposed to intercollegiate athletics. That philosophy has shifted back to intercollegiate sports as Université Laval, Université de Montréal and Sherbrooke each began programs in 1996, 2002 and 2003, respectively.

== See also ==
- U Sports
