= McMaster Marauders =

Athletic teams of McMaster University in Hamilton, Ontario, Canada

- University: McMaster University
- Nickname: Marauders
- Association: U Sports
- Conference: Ontario University Athletics
- Athletic director: Keenan Lewis Jeppesen
- Location: Hamilton, Ontario
- Football stadium: Ron Joyce Stadium
- Arena: Burridge Gymnasium in Ivor Wynne Centre
- Field: Back Tens Field
- Colours: Maroon and Grey
- Mascot: Mac the Marauder
- Fight song: "Shout for McMaster!"
- Website: marauders.ca
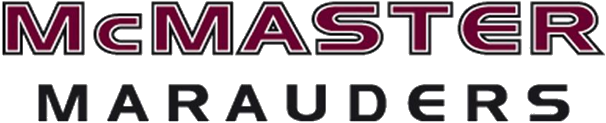

The McMaster Marauders are the athletic teams that represent McMaster University in Hamilton, Ontario, Canada. Athletics at McMaster is currently managed by the university's student affairs, under their athletics & recreation department. The university's 39 varsity teams compete in the Ontario University Athletics conference of U Sports. The Marauders' official colours are maroon and grey.

While technically not considered a varsity team, McMaster has a university ringette team which competes annually in the Canadian national University Challenge Cup.

== History ==
Soccer was the university's first major sport. In 1889, a group of alumni from the Toronto Baptist College and Woodstock College played an exhibition game against one another, sparking an early intercity rivalry (when McMaster University was based in Toronto). A full-fledged hockey club was later organized during the winter of 1896–1897. In 1897, the university had made all athletics, physical activity and sports under the jurisdiction of a central executive committee.

In 1906, McMaster University, along with the University of Ottawa, Royal Military College and University of Trinity College had joined the Canadian Intercollegiate Athletic Union (CIAU), the first formal organization of intercollegiate athletics in Canada and the forerunner of the present day Canadian Interuniversity Sport. The varsity teams have been known as the McMaster Marauders since 1948. The name, the Marauders had been credited to Bill Cline, who on 26 November 1948, had his suggestion for the nickname of the university's men's basketball team published on the school's student newspaper, The Silhouette.

== Varsity sports ==
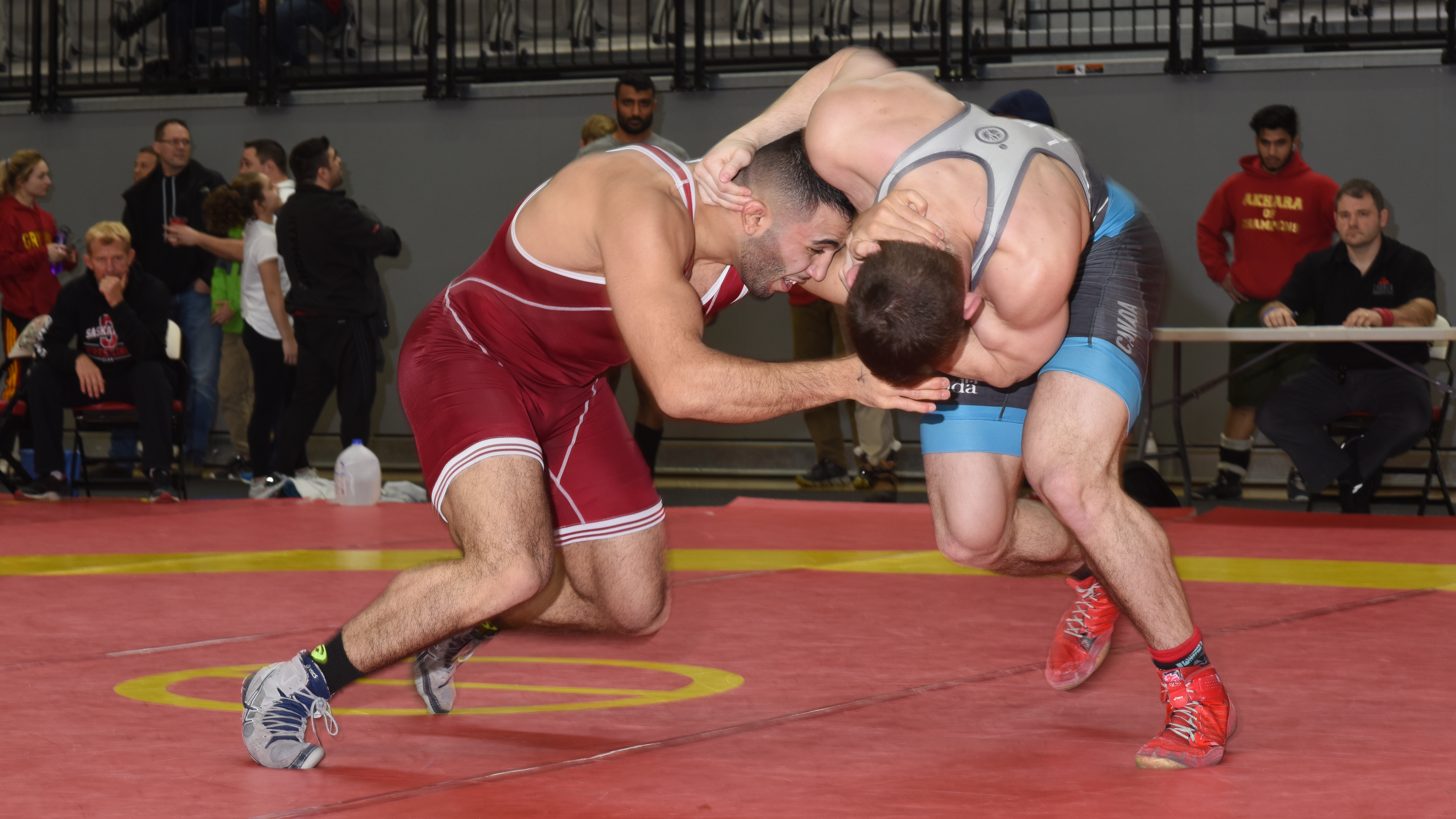
McMaster wrestling in 2019

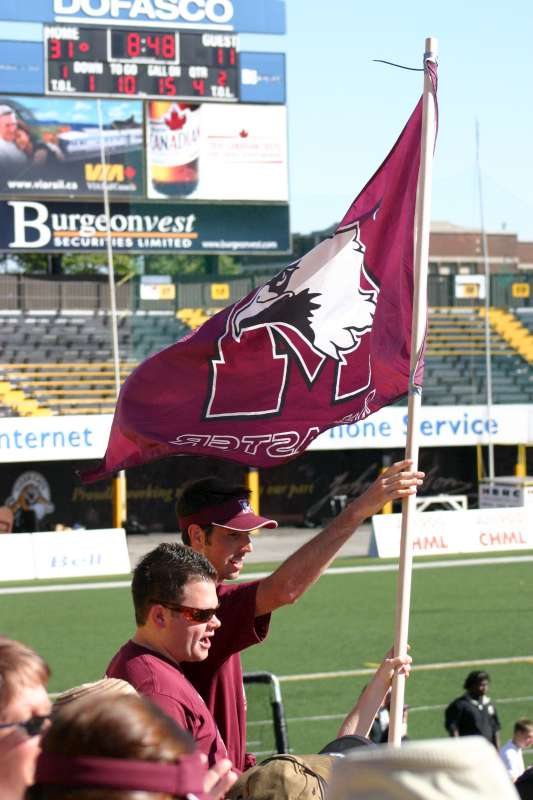
McMaster athletics flag

Men's sports	Women's sports
Badminton	Badminton
Baseball	Basketball
Basketball	Cross country
Cross country	Curling
Curling	Fastpitch softball
Fencing	Field hockey
Football	Figure skating
Golf	Golf
Lacrosse	Lacrosse
Nordic skiing	Nordic skiing
Rowing	Rowing
Rugby	Rugby
Soccer	Soccer
Squash	Squash
Swimming	Swimming
Tennis	Tennis
Volleyball	Volleyball
Water polo	Water polo
Wrestling	Wrestling

=== Football ===
The McMaster football team has been competing in organized play since 1901.

Ivor Wynne as the director of physical education, convinced the Canadian Intercollegiate Athletic Union (CIAU) to admit McMaster Marauders football into senior football competition in 1952, joining McGill, Queen's, Toronto, and Western.

The Marauders currently play in the Ontario University Athletics conference in Canadian Interuniversity Sport. The program has won eight Yates Cup conference championships and one Vanier Cup national championship, in 2011. As of the end of the 2011 CFL season, 51 McMaster Marauder alumni have played professionally in the Canadian Football League, including eight that currently play in the CFL.

== Former sports ==
=== Ice hockey ===
McMaster began its ice hockey program in 1902, playing first at the intermediate level. The team remained in the second tier of Canadian college hockey for several years but saw little success. After returning following the end of World War I, McMaster found itself mired at the bottom of the standings and decided to change tack. In 1920, the school decided to field a junior team in the Ontario Hockey Association. After the 20-and-under team went winless, the school abandoned the idea and then left the IIS for the Intermediate Groups. The program was cut off in 1989.

== Facilities ==
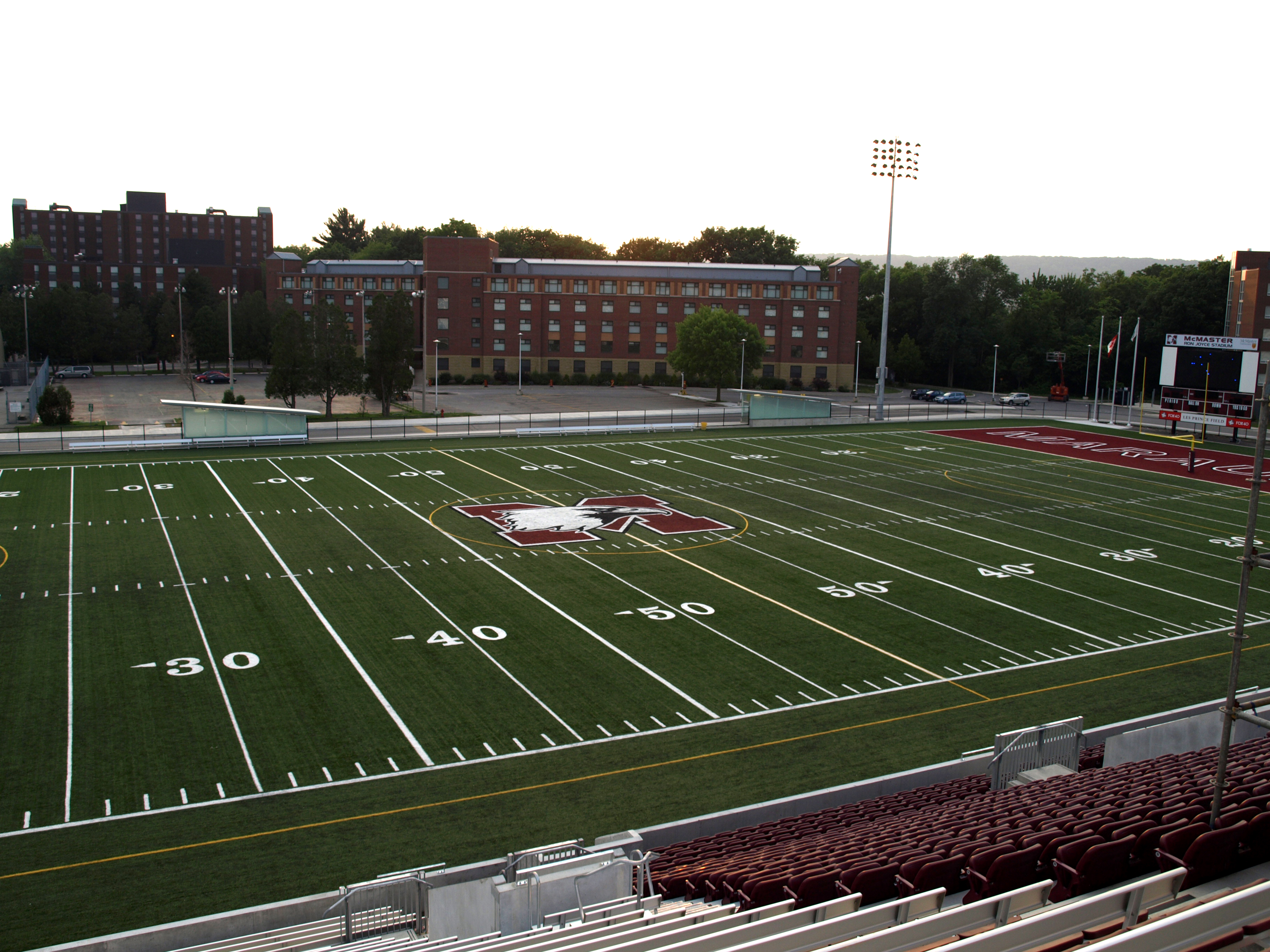
Ron Joyce stadium host the McMaster football, soccer, and rugby home matches

The Marauders currently use the sports facilities located in the northeast corner of the main campus of McMaster. The university has a number of sports facilities including the Ron Joyce Stadium for football, the Ivor Wynne Centre for indoor sports, and Back Tens Field for soccer and rugby. Ron Joyce Stadium fields a full sized Canadian football field and FIFA sized soccer pitch.

The stadium is also equipped with permanent seating for 5,500. The David Braley Athletic Centre, another sports venue at McMaster, is also used by the Marauders.

The Marauders football team on occasion used Ivor Wynne Stadium, the now-demolished home of the Hamilton Tiger-Cats.

== Championships ==
The Marauders have won several championships since they began competitive play in their provincial conference, as well as within the national league they are in. The following is a table of the number of championships won by the Marauders men's teams and individual competitors since the Canadian Interuniversity Athletic Union was formed in 1961 as well as the number of championships won by Marauders women's teams and individual competitors since the Ontario Women's Interuniversity Athletic Association was formed in 1971.

The men's water polo team has won the Ontario University Athletics championship 25 times, making it the most successful team at the provincial level. The men's wrestling team has been the most successful team at the national level, winning the CIS championship four times.

=== Provincial championships ===
Men's sports
Sport	Trophy	Winning years	Total
Basketball	Wilson Cup	1969–70, 1971–72,1986–87, 1993–94, 1995–96, 1996–97, 2005–06	7
Cross Country		1962–63, 1963–64, 1964–65, 2018–19, 2022-23	5
Curling		1956–57, 1957–58, 1961–62, 1966–67, 1969–70, 1970–71, 1998–99	7
Fencing		1986–1987	1
Football	Yates Cup	2000–01, 2001–02, 2002–03, 2003–04, 2011–12, 2012–13, 2014–15, 2019–20	8
Golf		1964–65, 1965–66, 1971–72, 1973–74, 2002–03, 2004–05, 2022-23	7
Gymnastics		1969–70, 1970–71, 1992–93, 1993–94	4
Ice Hockey	Queen's Cup	1962–63	1
Karate		1973–74, 1986–87	2
Rowing		1965–66, 1966–67	2
Rugby		1992–93, 2002–03, 2003–04, 2005–06, 2006–07, 2008–09, 2010–11	7
Sailing		1968–69, 1969–70	2
Soccer		1970–71, 1974–75, 1992–93, 2009–10, 2011–12, 2012–13, 2022–23	7
Swimming		1992–93, 1993–94, 1994–95, 1995–96, 1996–97, 1998–99, 1999–00, 2002–03	8
Tennis		1990–91, 1999–00	2
Track & Field		1966–67, 1969–70	2
Water Polo		1969–70, 1970–71, 1971–72, 1972–73, 1973–74, 1974–75, 1975–76, 1976–77, 1977–78, 1978–79, 1979–80, 1980–81, 1981–82, 1982–83, 1983–84, 1984–85, 1985–86, 1987–88, 1988–89, 1989–90, 1990–91, 1992–93, 1993–94, 1995–96, 1998–99, 2001–02	26
Wrestling		1984–85, 1985–86, 1987–88, 1992–93	4
Volleyball	Forsyth Cup	1991–92, 2007–08, 2008–09, 2010–11, 2012–13, 2013–14, 2014–15, 2015–16, 2016–17, 2017–18, 2021–22, 2022–23	12

Women's sports
Sport	Trophy	Winning years	Total
Badminton		1977–78	1
Basketball	Critelli Cup	1999–99, 2002–03, 2005–06	3
Curling		1989–90, 1994–95, 2019–20, 2022–23, 2024–25	5
Fencing		1973–74	1
Figure Skating		1971–72	1
Gymnastics		1977–78, 1979–80, 1980–81, 1981–82, 1982–83, 1985–86, 1988–89, 1992–93, 1993–94	9
Ice Hockey	McCaw Cup	1975–76, 1977–78	2
Rowing		1973–74, 1974–75, 1975–76	3
Soccer		1987–88, 1991–92	2
Squash		1990–91	1
Swimming		1992–93, 1993–94, 1994–95, 1997–98, 1998–99, 1999–00	6
Synchronized swimming		1971–72, 1978–79, 1979–80, 1980–81, 1984–85	5
Tennis		1974–75, 1975–76, 1978–79, 1983–84, 1985–86, 1986–87, 2000–01	7
Track & Field		1974–75, 1975–76, 1976–77, 1977–78	4
Volleyball	Quigley Cup	2007-8, 2013–14, 2016–2017	3
Water Polo		1991–92, 2001–02, 2002–03, 2003–04, 2004–05	5

=== National Championships (U SPORTS, CIS) ===
Men's sports
Sport	Winning years	Total
Baseball	1997	1
Lacrosse	2010	1
Cross Country	1963, 2022	2
Football	2011	1
Ice Hockey	1962–63	1
Tennis	1999–00	1
Wrestling	1984–85, 1985–86, 1987–88, 1993–94	4

Women's sports
Sport	Winning years	Total
Basketball	2018–19	1
Gymnastics	1980–81	1
Rugby	2014–15	1
Soccer	1991–92	1
Tennis	1999–00	1
