= Alberta Golden Bears and Pandas =

Intercollegiate sports teams of the University of Alberta

- University: University of Alberta
- Nickname: Golden Bears; Pandas
- Association: U Sports
- Conference: Canada West
- Athletic director: Ian Reade
- Location: Edmonton, Alberta
- Varsity teams: 24 (12 men's, 12 women's)
- Football stadium: Foote Field
- Ice hockey arena: Clare Drake Arena
- Gymnasium: Saville Community Sports Centre
- Other venues: Universiade Pavilion
- Colors: Green and gold
- Mascot: GUBA (Great University Bear of Alberta)
- Fight song: "Alberta Cheer Song"
- Website: bearsandpandas.ca/index.aspx

The Alberta Golden Bears and Pandas are the sports teams that represent the University of Alberta in Edmonton, Alberta, Canada. Alberta athletics teams have won a total of 101 national championships, including 84 in U Sports sanctioned sports, making it one of the most successful programs in the country.

== History ==
The University of Alberta has featured varsity teams since the school's inception in 1908, notably with the men's ice hockey team first playing a season of six games during that school year. The school's colours of evergreen and gold were approved as the varsity teams' official colours on October 13, 1908. The football team adopted the name "Golden Bears" for the 1935 season with the men's basketball team following suit in 1936 and all other male varsity programs soon after. After World War II ended and teams resumed play, the women's varsity teams first began playing under the "Pandas" moniker which was adopted by all of the school's women's teams.

Currently, Alberta's athletics program fields 24 teams in 14 different sports administered by U Sports in the Canada West conference. The football and soccer teams play their home games at Foote Field, and the basketball and volleyball teams' home is the Saville Community Sports Centre. The ice hockey teams play at Clare Drake Arena, named after long-time coach Clare Drake. Professor W. G. Hardy coached the men's team from 1922 to 1926, and played a leading role in getting the first ice hockey rink built at the university campus in 1927.

== Varsity teams ==
| Men's sports | Women's sports |
|---|---|
| Basketball | Basketball |
| Cross country | Cross country |
| Curling | Curling |
| Football | Rugby |
| Golf | Golf |
| Ice hockey | Ice hockey |
| Soccer | Soccer |
| Swimming | Swimming |
| Tennis | Tennis |
| Track and field^{1} | Track and field^{1} |
| Volleyball | Volleyball |
| Wrestling | Wrestling |
^{1} – includes both indoor and outdoor

=== Football ===
The Golden Bears football program has been in competition since 1910. The Golden Bears have won three Vanier Cup national championships, in 1967, 1972 and most recently in 1980. The program has also won 16 Hardy Cup conference titles, which is the third most championships won in the conference. The program has also had three players win the Hec Crighton Trophy, with Mel Smith winning in 1971, Bryan Fryer winning in 1975, and most recently Ed Ilnicki winning the award in 2017.

=== Men's ice hockey ===
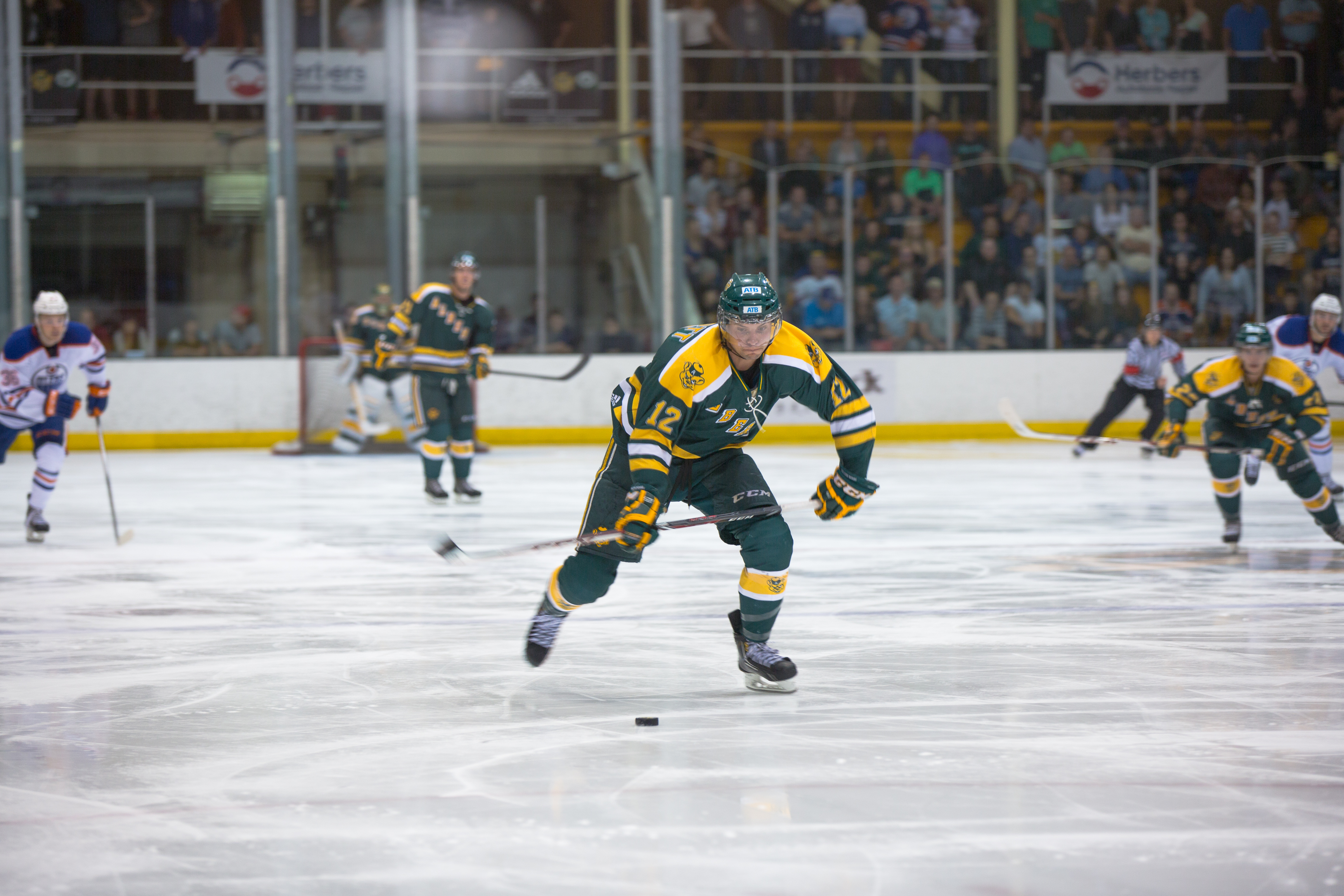
The Golden Bears played against the Edmonton Oilers rookies in 2014

The U Sports men's ice hockey program has been competing since 1908, in the same year that the University of Alberta was first established. The Golden Bears have won the most David Johnston University Cup championships with 16 wins, most recently in 2018. The program has also featured 55 conference championship teams, including a recent period of domination where Golden Bear teams have won 16 out of 20 Canada West championships from 2000 to 2020. The team's head coach, Ian Herbers, returned to the team in 2018 following a stint with the Edmonton Oilers after previously being the team's head coach for three seasons from 2012 to 2015.

=== Women's ice hockey ===
The University of Alberta has featured a women's ice hockey program since at least 1913, near the beginning years of the school's creation in 1908. Since U Sports women's ice hockey became a nationally sanctioned sport in 1997, the Pandas have been the most prolific program in the country with eight national championships won, with the most recent victory occurring in 2017. The program has also been dominant in Canada West play as Panda teams have won 14 conference championships, including seven in a row from 2001 to 2008. The team has been led by head coach Howie Draper since the inaugural season in 1997–98.

=== Men's volleyball ===
The Golden Bears men's volleyball first began intercollegiate play in the 1955–56 season and has competed in the Canada West conference since the 1971–72 season. The Golden Bears first won a U Sports men's volleyball championship in 1981 and have won nine national championships in total, including the most recent in 2024, which is tied for the most out of all of the U Sports men's volleyball programs. The program has also featured 17 Canada West conference champions, most recently in 2024. Golden Bears players have won the U Sports Men's Volleyball Player of the Year award 11 times, the most in the country, with Terry Danyluk winning the first two.

=== Women's volleyball ===
The Pandas women's volleyball program first began in the 1950s where the team won their first Western Canadian Intercollegiate Athletic Union championship in 1953. The Pandas first qualified for the U Sports women's volleyball championship tournament in 1993 under the direction of then-second year head coach Laurie Eisler and soon won the first national championship in team history in 1995. The Pandas then repeated as champions five times to tie the U Sports women's volleyball record with six consecutive national championships won. The team won their seventh and most recent national championship in 2007, with their seven wins second only to the UBC Thunderbirds. The Pandas have also won 18 conference titles with their most recent occurring in 2017. Eisler continues to serve as the team's head coach and has won the Marilyn Pomfret Award as the U Sports Coach of the Year three times. Five Pandas players have won the Mary Lyons Award with Miroslava Pribylova winning in 1996 and 1997, Jenny Cartmell winning in 1999 and 2000, Tiffany Dodds winning in 2007, Meg Casault winning in 2017, and Kory White winning most recently in 2022.

=== Women's rugby ===
The Pandas women's rugby program began in the 1970s and had significant successes between 1999 and 2006. Matt Parrish is the current Head Coach.

== Awards and standings ==
The Golden Bears are considered a strong school team in Canada in multiple sports. The hockey and volleyball teams, in particular, are frequent challengers in U Sports national championships.

In addition to their success over Canadian competition, the Golden Bears host the annual Husky Energy Can-Am Challenge of Champions tournament, where they frequently spearhead the Canadian contingent's success. This tournament sees four top teams from both Canada and the USA competing for supremacy, with the Canadian teams holding the overall title, having won 9 of the 13 tournaments.

=== Championships ===
| Sport | Nat. titles | Years | Nat. app. | Years | Conf. titles | Years | Conf. podiums | Details |
|---|---|---|---|---|---|---|---|---|
| Basketball | 3 | 1994, 1995, 2002 | 10 | 1974, 1977, 1990 (7th), 1996 (2nd), 1998 (7th), 1999 (2nd), 2000 (5th), 2003 (t3), 2005 (t5), 2008 (t7), 2012 (t2) | 13 | 1969, 1973, 1974, 1977, 1985, 1987, 1990, 1994, 1999, 2000, 2005, 2012, 2014, 2017 | 24 | 1st – 10, 2nd – 6, 3rd – 8 |
| Cross-Country | 1 | 1980 | 16 | 1983 (2nd), 1984 (4th), 1985 (4th), 1986 (2nd), 1997 (5th), 1998 (12th), 1999 (9th), 2000 (2nd), 2001 (4th), 2002 (3rd), 2003 (3rd), 2004 (3rd), 2005 (4th), 2006 (7th), 2007 (12th), 2008 (t9) | 12 | 1975, 1976, 1980, 1982, 1983, 1984, 1986, 2000, 2001, 2002, 2003, 2004) | 22 | 1st – 12, 2nd – 6, 3rd – 4 |
| Curling | 3 | 2012, 2015, 2018 | 10 | 2008, 2010, 2011, 2014, 2016, 2017, 2019, 2020, 2023, 2024 | 6 | 1973, 1974, 1975, 2019, 2020, 2022 | | - |
| Football | 3 | 1967, 1972, 1980 | 3 | 1965, 1971, 1981 | 16 | 1922, 1926, 1928, 1944, 1946, 1947, 1948, 1960, 1963, 1964, 1967, 1971, 1972, 1979, 1980, 1981) | 22 | 1st – 16, 2nd – 6 |
| Hockey | 16 | 1964, 1968, 1975, 1978, 1979, 1980, 1986, 1992, 1999, 2000, 2005, 2006, 2008, 2014, 2015, 2018) | 22 | 1966 (2nd), 1969 (3rd), 1970, 1972 (3rd), 1973, 1977, 1984, 1985 (2nd), 1987, 1989, 1991 (2nd), 1993, 1997, 1998, 2001, 2002, 2003 (3rd), 2004 (4th), 2009, 2010 (2nd), 2011, 2013) | 56 | 1934, 1936–1940, 1946–1951, 1954–1958, 1960–1962, 1964, 1966–1970, 1972, 1973, 1975, 1977–1979, 1984, 1985, 1989, 1991–1993, 1997, 2001–2006, 2008–2011, 2013–2015, 2017–2019, 2022) | 39 | 1st – 25, 2nd – 10, 3rd – 4 |
| Soccer | 5 | 1972, 1979, 2003, 2006, 2016) | 7 | 1973 (2nd), 1981 (2nd), 1988 (3rd), 1994 (2nd), 1995 (2nd), 1998 (2nd), 1999 (2nd)) | 11 | 1972, 1973, 1979, 1981, 1988, 1995, 1998, 1999, 2003, 2011, 2017) | 31 | 1st – 9, 2nd – 8, 3rd – 14 |
| Swimming | 0 | – | 37 | 1972–2009: 2nd – 2, 3rd – 10, 4th – 7, 5th – 2, 6th – 5, 7th – 2, 8th – 2, 9th – 1, 10th – 2, 12th – 3, 18th – 1 | 15 | 1961, 1963, 1968, 1969, 1970, 1971, 1973, 1974, 1975, 1976, 1978, 1979, 1992, 1993, 1996) | 32 | 1st – 9, 2nd – 7, 3rd – 16 |
| Track and Field | 1 | 2001 | 27 | 1981–1987, 1989–2000, 2002–2009: 2nd – 3, 3rd – 5, 4th – 2, 5th – 3, 6th – 4, 7th – 2, 8th – 1, 10th – 2, 11th – 2, 14th – 1, 16th – 1, 19th – 1) | 7 | 1978, 1979, 1980, 1982, 1993, 2006, 2018) | 25 | 1st – 6, 2nd – 11, 3rd – 8 |
| Volleyball | 10 | 1981, 1997, 2002, 2005, 2008, 2009, 2014, 2015, 2022, 2024) | 18 | 1975 (2nd), 1980 (3rd), 1990 (6th), 1993 (5th), 1994 (4th), 1995 (4th), 1996 (2nd), 1998 (3rd), 1999 (3rd), 2001 (5th), 2003 (2nd), 2004 (2nd), 2006 (2nd), 2007 (2nd), 2010 (3rd), 2011 (5th), 2012 (6th), 2013 (5th)) | 16 | 1961, 1966, 1975, 1981, 1995, 1996, 1997, 1999, 2005, 2006, 2008, 2009, 2010, 2014, 2015) | 30 | 1st – 13, 2nd – 11, 3rd – 6 |
| Wrestling | 5 | 1970, 1971, 1972, 2013, 2025) | 33 | 1980, 1983–1987, 1989–2015: 1st – 1, 2nd – 1, 3rd – 2, 4th – 1, 5th – 4, 6th – 3, 7th – 4, 8th – 2, 9th – 3, 10th – 4, 11th – 2, 13th – 1, 14th – 1, 16th – 1 | 19 | 1963, 1968, 1970, 1971, 1972, 1973, 1977, 1979, 1980, 1981, 1983, 1985, 2013, 2014, 2015, 2017, 2018, 2019, 2022) | 27 | 1st – 15, 2nd – 7, 3rd – 5 |
| Total | 44 | | 183 | | 168 | | 252 | 1st – 115, 2nd – 72, 3rd – 65 |

== Awards and honours ==
=== Athletes of the Year ===
The female athlete of the year is awarded the Bakewell Trophy while the Wilson Challenge Trophy is presented to the male athlete of the year.

Alberta Golden Bears and Pandas athletes of the year since the 2019–20
| Year | Female athlete | Sport | Male athlete | Sport | Ref. |
|---|---|---|---|---|---|
| 2019–20 | Kory White | Volleyball | Max Elgert | Volleyball | |
| 2020–21 | Not awarded due to the COVID-19 pandemic. | | | | |
| 2021–22 | Catharina Kluyts | Track & Field | Tyus Jefferson | Basketball | |
| 2022–23 | Olivia Cooper | Track & Field | Jordan Canham | Volleyball | |
| 2023–24 | Aleah Nickel | Wrestling | Isaac Heslinga | Volleyball | |
| 2024–25 | Vianne Rouleau | Wrestling | Isaac Heslinga | Volleyball | |

=== Canada West Hall of Fame ===
- Janine Helland, Soccer: Canada West Hall of Fame - 2019 Inductee
