= Canada West Universities Athletic Association =

Association for universities in Western Canada

- Formerly: Western Canadian Intercollegiate Athletic Union (1919–19xx); Western Canadian Intercollegiate Athletic Association (19xx–1972)
- Conference: U Sports
- Founded: 1972
- Sports fielded: 12; men's: 9; women's: 11
- No. of teams: 17 (18 in 2027)
- Region: Western Canada
- Website: canadawest.org

Canada West (formally the Canada West Universities Athletic Association or CWUAA) is a regional membership association for universities in Western Canada which assists in co-ordinating competition between their university level athletic programs and providing contact information, schedules, results, and releases about those programs and events to the public and the media. This is similar to what would be called a college athletic conference in the United States. Canada West is one of four such bodies that are members of the country's governing body for university athletics, U Sports. The other three regional associations coordinating university-level sports in Canada are Ontario University Athletics (OUA), Atlantic University Sport (AUS), and the Réseau du sport étudiant du Québec (RSEQ).

== History ==
Locations of the Canada West member institutions

The Western Canadian Intercollegiate Athletic Union (WCIAU — later renamed Western Canadian Intercollegiate Athletic Association) was formed in 1919–20 as the first recognized western-based post-secondary athletic organization in Canada, with the University of Manitoba winning the first-ever league championship, a men's hockey title, in 1920.

In the spring of 1972, the WCIAA was split into the Canada West Universities Athletic Association (CWUAA) and the Great Plains Athletic Association (GPAA - later renamed the Great Plains Athletic Conference).

CWUAA consisted of schools spanning from Victoria to Saskatoon (Victoria, British Columbia, Calgary, Alberta, Lethbridge and Saskatchewan), while GPAA's member institutions stretched from Regina to Thunder Bay (Regina, Brandon, Winnipeg, Manitoba, Lakehead).

=== Membership changes ===
In 1985–86, Canada West offered playing privileges to men's hockey teams from the Great Plains Athletic Conference (GPAC) with other sports following over the years, culminating with the 2001–02 merger of basketball.

Since 1999, 11 additional schools have joined the Canada West's six charter members. Trinity Western joined in 1999–00 and, in 2000–01, all schools from the Great Plains Athletic Conference (GPAC) except for Brandon were provided full membership in Canada West (Manitoba, Regina and Winnipeg). Brandon joined as an associate member at the time, until full membership was granted in 2005.

Simon Fraser joined Canada West in 2000, followed by Thompson Rivers in 2005 and Fraser Valley in 2006.

Simon Fraser withdrew from the conference as a member after the 2009–10 season, following this, Simon Fraser officially became the first Canadian university to join the NCAA in the 2011–12 season; while both Thompson Rivers and Fraser Valley were awarded full membership in 2010 and, at the same time, UBC Okanagan received probationary membership.

In 2011, Mount Royal University and the University of Northern British Columbia were voted in as probationary members and began active competing in 2012–13.

In 2013, UBC Okanagan was awarded full membership, while Mount Royal University and the University of Northern British Columbia were awarded full membership in 2014.

Full membership was granted to MacEwan University in the spring of 2015, after the Edmonton-based university fulfilled their probationary membership requirements and was accepted by Canada West membership as the conference's 17th member.

In 2025, Simon Fraser announced their withdrawal from the NCAA and their intent to return to Canada West and U Sports effective for the fall of 2027. Their application to compete as a probationary member was approved by Canada West in May 2026, and by U Sports in June 2026.

== Member schools ==
=== Current members ===
Institution	Location	Founded	Affiliation	Enrollment	Endowment	Nickname	Joined (Note: Represents the calendar year when fall sports competition begins.)	Division
University of Alberta	Edmonton, Alberta	1908	Public	36,435	$1.7B	Golden Bears (men's); Pandas (women's)	1972	Prairie
Brandon University	Brandon, Manitoba	1890	Public	3,383	$34M	Bobcats	2001	Prairie
University of British Columbia	Vancouver, British Columbia	1908	Public	43,579	$2.8B	Thunderbirds	1972	Pacific
University of British Columbia–Okanagan	Kelowna, British Columbia	2005	Public	8,307	$2.8B	Heat	2010	Pacific
University of Calgary	Calgary, Alberta	1966	Public	28,196	$1.17B	Dinos	1972	Prairie
University of the Fraser Valley	Abbotsford, British Columbia	1974	Public	21,500	---	Cascades	2006	Pacific
University of Lethbridge	Lethbridge, Alberta	1967	Public	8,000+	$104.5M	Pronghorns	1972	Prairie
University of Manitoba	Winnipeg, Manitoba	1877	Public	27,599	$878M	Bisons	2001	Prairie
MacEwan University	Edmonton, Alberta	1971	Public	19,606	---	Griffins	2013	Prairie
Mount Royal University	Calgary, Alberta	1910	Public	14,175	$99M	Cougars	2011	Prairie
University of Northern British Columbia	Prince George, British Columbia	1990	Public	4,183	$62.8M	Timberwolves	2011	Pacific
University of Regina	Regina, Saskatchewan	1911	Public	12,800	$128.4M	Cougars (Note: Nickname is used for other sports except football.); Rams (Note: Nickname is used for football only.)	2001	Prairie
University of Saskatchewan	Saskatoon, Saskatchewan	1907	Public	19,082	$509.1M	Huskies	1972	Prairie
Thompson Rivers University	Kamloops, British Columbia	1970	Public	13,072	---	WolfPack	2005	Pacific
Trinity Western University	Langley, British Columbia	1962	Evangelical/ E.F.C.C.	2,700	$22.4M	Spartans	1999	Pacific
University of Victoria	Victoria, British Columbia	1903	Public	19,500	$525M	Vikes	1972	Pacific
University of Winnipeg	Winnipeg, Manitoba	1871	Public	9,219	$64.7M	Wesmen	2001	Prairie

=== Future full member ===
Institution	Location	Founded	Joining	Type	Enrollment	Endowment	Nickname	Colors	Current conference
Simon Fraser University	Burnaby, British Columbia	1965	2027 (Note: Simon Fraser was previously a full member of Canada West from 2000–2010.)	Public	35,604	$605M	Red Leafs (Note: Nickname has been used since fall 2022. Until spring 2020, its former nicknames were Clan and Clansmen.)		Great Northwest (GNAC) (Note: Currently an NCAA Division II athletic conference.); Canada West in 2027.

=== Former member ===
Institution	Location	Founded	Affiliation	Enrollment	Endowment	Nickname	Joined (Note: Represents the calendar year when fall sports competition begins.)	Left (Note: Represents the calendar year when spring sports competition ends.)	Current conference
Simon Fraser University	Burnaby, British Columbia	1965	Public	35,604	$605M	Red Leafs (Note: Nickname has been used since fall 2022. Until spring 2020, its former nicknames were Clan and Clansmen.)	2000	2010	Great Northwest (GNAC) (Note: Currently an NCAA Division II athletic conference.); Canada West in 2027.

=== Membership timeline ===
Full member (non-football)

== Facilities ==
Facilities
Institution	Football Stadium	Seated Capacity	Basketball/Volleyball Gym	Seated Capacity	Hockey Arena	Seated Capacity	Soccer Field	Seated Capacity
Alberta	Foote Field	3,500	Saville Community Sports Centre	2,600	Clare Drake Arena	3,000	Foote Soccer Field	1,500
Brandon	Non-football school		Healthy Living Centre	1,000	Non-hockey school		HLC Field	500
UBC	Thunderbird Stadium	3,441	War Memorial Gymnasium	2,222	Doug Mitchell Thunderbird Sports Centre	7,200	Thunderbird Stadium	3,441
UBC Okanagan	Non-football school		UBC Okanagan Campus Gym	1,000	Non-hockey school		Nonis Sports Field	500
Calgary	McMahon Stadium	35,650	Jack Simpson Gymnasium	2,700	Father David Bauer Olympic Arena	1,750	West Varsity Soccer Pitch	500
Fraser Valley	Non-football school		Envision Athletic Centre	1,700	Non-hockey school		MRC Sports Complex	500
Lethbridge	Non-football school		1st Choice Savings Centre (Basketball only)	2,500	Non-hockey school		University Field	2,000
MacEwan	Non-football school		Christenson Family Centre for Sport and Wellness	2,000	Downtown Community Arena	1,000	Jasper Place Bowl	1,000
Manitoba	Princess Auto Stadium	33,500	Investors Group Athletic Centre	3,100	Max Bell Centre	1,400	Turf East Field (Women's only)	300
Mount Royal	Non-football school		Kenyon Court	1,940	Flames Community Arenas	500	Mount Royal Fields	500
UNBC	Non-football school		Charles Jago Northern Sports Centre (Basketball only)	2,000	Non-hockey school		NCSSL Field	1,800
Regina	Mosaic Stadium	33,000	UR CKHS (Basketball/Women's Volleyball only)	2,000	The Co-operators Centre	1,000	Leibel Field (Women's only)	500
Saskatchewan	Griffiths Stadium	6,171	PAC	2,426	Merlis Belsher Place	2,700	Field 7 in PotashCorp Park	400
Simon Fraser	Non-football school		West Gymnasium	1,500	Non-hockey school		Terry Fox Field	1,823
Thompson Rivers	Non-football school		Tournament Capital Centre	2,200	Non-hockey school		Hillside Stadium	1,060
Trinity Western	Non-football school		Langley Events Centre	2,000	Langley Events Centre	5,300	Chase Office Field	500
Victoria	Non-football school		CARSA Performance Gym (Basketball only)	2,100	Non-hockey school		Centennial Stadium	5,000
Winnipeg	Non-football school		Duckworth Centre	1,780	Non-hockey school		Non-soccer school	

(Data mined from the U Sports homepage's member directory and WorldStadiums.com. The member directory numbers seem to be ballpark figures in some cases.)

== Future expansion ==
The media has reported that the following institutions are building their athletic programs for potential admission into the association.

- Capilano University
- Vancouver Island University

In 2012 the conference declared they would not take applications from new schools, as Canada West approved a bid from Grant MacEwan University (now rebranded as MacEwan University) in 2013.

== Scholarships, UBC, Simon Fraser University, and the NAIA ==
In May 2005, UBC made a formal bid to join the NCAA, but decided in April 2011 to remain a part of Canada West Athletics. See the UBC article for more details.

Simon Fraser University (then known as the SFU Clan before changing to the Red Leafs in 2022) did not compete in what is now known as U Sports until 2002, after a failed attempt to join the U.S. NCAA. On July 10, 2009, the NCAA accepted SFU's bid to join NCAA Division II in the 2011–12 season. Canada West proceeded as a 13-team, 14 member conference for 2010–11, with the inclusion of UBC-Okanagan as a non-competing, probationary member for 2010–11, in time to begin competition (pending summer 2011 CIS approval) for the 2011–12 season. In May 2011, Mount Royal was awarded Canada West membership, effective September 2011, with competition to begin in the 2012–13 season. In May 2013, Grant MacEwan was approved as a 17th Canada West member starting in the 2013–14 season.

From its inception in 1965, Simon Fraser competed in the NAIA to allow "full ride" scholarships. Canadian schools did not allow any form of scholarships until the late 1980s. SFU was forced to leave the NAIA in many sports due to schools in the Northwest US shifting to the NCAA. Until 2009, the NCAA limited membership to schools based in the U.S. Some Simon Fraser teams still competed in the U.S. before the school moved to the NCAA, and their men's wrestling program competed in the then-CIS and the NAIA. UBC has several of its programs (baseball, golf, outdoor track and field and softball) compete in the NAIA.

In 2025, Simon Fraser formally announced their resignation from the NCAA, opting to return to Canada West for competition, citing the United States political landscape and the changes in the governance of the NCAA. On May 7, Canada West announced the university's re-acceptance as a probationary member, with all sports except women's volleyball expected to begin play in 2027.

== Canada West TV ==
On August 24, 2011, the association announced the launch of Canadawest.tv as the official home of web-based broadcasting for all 14 Canada West member institutions during the 2011–12 season and beyond. On May 10, 2017, Canada West announced a multi-year deal with Surrey, BC based streaming company, Yare Media, to develop a re-vamped service for the 2017–18 season. In 2017, a dramatic 59-yard field goal kick by Niko DiFonte with two seconds on the clock lifted the Calgary Dinos over the UBC Thunderbirds to win the 81st Hardy Cup football championship in November. Immediately, the footage circulated across mainstream media. Not only did the clip of the record-breaking kick get coverage on television networks and social media channels across North America – including Sportsnet, TSN, CBC, ESPN, NFL.com and USA Today – but it also showcased the streaming quality of the new-look Canada West TV.

In January 2018, Canada West announced record viewing numbers for the new service. On June 8, 2020, the conference announced cancellation of fall sports and no events were featured on Canadawest.tv. Throughout the remainder of 2020 the conference would announce a series of cancellations. The conference announced the resumption of Canadawest.tv streaming on Aug 3, 2021. The 2021–22 season marked the tenth year of Canada West TV service and the first year with streaming partner Visaic after its acquisition of Yare Media in 2020.
