= Manitoba Bisons =

Athletic teams that represent the University of Manitoba

- University: University of Manitoba
- Nickname: Bisons
- Association: U Sports
- Conference: Canada West Universities Athletic Association
- Athletic director: Gene Muller
- Location: Winnipeg, Manitoba
- Football stadium: Princess Auto Stadium
- Arena: Max Bell Centre
- Other stadiums: University Stadium (Winnipeg)
- Other venues: Investors Group Athletic Centre
- Colours: Brown and Gold
- Mascot: Billy the Bison
- Fight song: "Brown and Gold"
- Website: gobisons.ca

The Manitoba Bisons are the athletic teams that represent the University of Manitoba in Winnipeg, Manitoba, Canada. The football team plays at Princess Auto Stadium, the soccer team plays at the outdoor soccer field on campus, track and field teams use University Stadium, and the volleyball and basketball teams play at Investors Group Athletic Centre. The University has 18 different teams in 10 sports: basketball, curling, cross country running, Canadian football, golf, ice hockey, soccer, swimming, track & field, and volleyball.

== Varsity sports ==
Men's sports	Women's sports
Basketball	Basketball
Cross country	Cross country
Football	Ice hockey
Golf	Golf
Ice hockey	Soccer
Swimming	Swimming
Track and field	Track and field
Volleyball	Volleyball

=== Men's ice hockey ===
The Bisons iced a junior ice hockey team in the Manitoba Junior Hockey League. The Bisons won four consecutive Turnbull Cups as Manitoba junior champions in 1922, 1923, 1924, and 1925.

The 1923 Bisons team won the Allan Cup, Memorial Cup and Abbott Cup, and were inducted into the Manitoba Hockey Hall of Fame in 2023. The roster included J.A. Wise (Forward), C.E. Williams (Sub Forward), C.S. Doupe (Sub Goal), F. Robertson (Sub Defence), R.E. Moulden (Forward), A.I. Chapman (Defence), Blake Watson (Forward), Murray Murdoch (Captain & Centre), A.T. Puttee (Goal), J. Mitchell (Forward), A. Johnson (Defence), S.B. Field (Secretary/Treasurer), R.L. Bruce (Manager), H. Andrews (President), Hal Moulden (Coach), Walter Robertson (Trainer).

The school's senior ice hockey team won the 1931 World Ice Hockey Championships playing as the University of Manitoba Grads, and were inducted into the Manitoba Hockey Hall of Fame in the team category. The roster included Sammy McCallum, Gordon MacKenzie, Blake Watson, Art Puttee, Frank Morris, George Hill, Ward McVey, Jack Pidcock, Guy "Weary" Williamson.

In December 1934, the university appealed to W. A. Fry and the Amateur Athletic Union of Canada regarding a decision by the Manitoba Amateur Hockey Association (MAHA) which did not require university students be released from a private club team to play for the school team. Fry agreed with the university, stating that students are under the jurisdiction of the school unless released by the school to play for a club team. He also stated that AAU of C rulings should be respected by affiliated organizations, such as the MAHA.

The 1965 Bisons won the David Johnston University Cup as the Canadian Interuniversity Athletics Union champions, and were also inducted into the Manitoba Hockey Hall of Fame.

==== NHL alumni ====
List of National Hockey League alumni of the Bisons:

- Clint Albright
- Andy Blair
- Art Chapman
- Tom Cook
- Jimmy Creighton
- Stu Grimson
- George Maneluk
- Morris Mott
- Murray Murdoch
- Don Raleigh
- Mike Ridley
- Gus Rivers
- Jack Ruttan
- Wilfie Starr
- Ron Talakoski

==== Other notable people ====
- Wayne Fleming, National Hockey League coach, and Manitoba Bisons coach
- Bob Lowes, Two-time Canadian Hockey League Coach of the Year
- Claude C. Robinson, Canadian ice hockey and sports executive, inductee into the Hockey Hall of Fame and the Canadian Olympic Hall of Fame
- Barry Trotz, 1994 Calder Cup and 2018 Stanley Cup champion head coach, two-time Jack Adams Award winner

=== Football ===
The Bisons football program includes one of only four U Sports football teams to have won back-to-back Vanier Cup championships, having won in 1969 and 1970. In total, the Bisons have won three Vanier Cup national championships and 11 Hardy Trophy conference championships.

==== Notable players ====
- Randy Ambrosie
- Gavin Cobb
- Anthony Coombs
- Nic Demski
- Darnell Edwards
- Brock Gowanlock
- Geoff Gray
- Israel Idonije (Note: Nigerian-Canadian professional American football defensive end, primarily for the Chicago Bears of the National Football League.)
- Kienan LaFrance
- D. J. Lalama
- Wade Miller
- David Onyemata (Note: Nigerian-Canadian professional American football defensive tackle for the New Orleans Saints of the National Football League (NFL 2016))
- Don Oramasionwu
- Landon Rice
- Shai Ross
- Eddie Steele
- Zack Williams

=== Soccer ===
Manitoba Bisons women's team plays in Canada West.

=== Basketball ===
Manitoba Bisons men's and women's teams play in Canada West.

== Notable alumni ==
- Dalima Chhibber, Indian soccer player
- Gordon Orlikow (b. 1960), decathlon, heptathlon, and hurdles competitor, Athletics Canada chairman, Canadian Olympic Committee member, Korn/Ferry International partner; competed for the Manitoba Bisons in track and field; honored on the Bisons Walkway of Honour
- David Onyemata, defensive tackle for the New York Jets

== Awards and honours ==
- 2020 Lieutenant Governor Athletic Awards: Kelsey Wog, Swimming

=== Athletes of the Year ===
List of Manitoba Bisons athletes of the year since 2008–09
Year	Female Athlete	Sport	Male Athlete	Sport	Ref.
2008–09	Stacey Corfield	Hockey	Quin Ferguson	Track and Field	
2009–10	Desiree Scott	Soccer	Steve Christie	Hockey	
2011–12	Addie Miles	Hockey	Dane Pischke	Volleyball	
2012–13	Rachel Cockrell	Volleyball	Blair Macaulay	Hockey	
2013–14	Brittany Habing	Volleyball	Anthony Coombs	Football	
2014–15	Rachel Cockrell	Volleyball	Al-Haji Mansaray	Track and Field	
2016–17	Lauryn Keen	Hockey	Devren Dear	Volleyball	
2017–18	Venla Hovi	Ice hockey	Justus Alleyn	Basketball	
2018–19	Kelsey Wog	Swimming	Simon Bérubé	Track and Field	
2019–20	Kelsey Wog	Swimming	Rashawn Browne	Basketball	
2020–21	Cancelled due to the COVID-19 pandemic.				
2021–22	Kelsey Wog	Swimming	Brock Gowanlock	Football	
2022–23	Madisson Lawrence	Track and Field	AK Gassama	Football	
2023–24	Raya Surinx	Volleyball	Max Speiser	Track and Field	

=== Canada West Hall of Fame ===
- Coleen Dufresne, Basketball Coach, 2019 Inductee
- Desiree Scott, Soccer, 2019 Inductee
