= Trinity Western Spartans =

Athletic teams that represent Trinity Western University

- University: Trinity Western University
- Nickname: Spartans
- Association: U Sports
- Conference: Canada West
- Athletic director: Jeff Gamache
- Location: Langley, British Columbia
- Varsity teams: 14 (7 men's, 7 women's)
- Arena: Langley Events Centre
- Soccer stadium: Chase Office Field
- Colours: Blue and Gold
- Mascot: Sparty
- Fight song: "The Spartan Song"
- Website: gospartans.ca
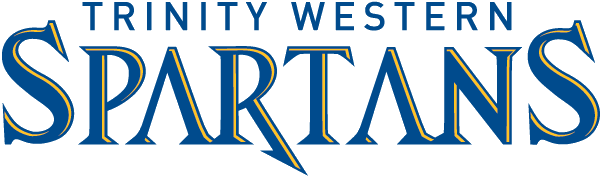

The Trinity Western Spartans are the athletic teams that represent Trinity Western University in Langley, British Columbia. The university's teams are members of U Sports (previously CIS), and compete in the Canada West Universities Athletics Association, and where applicable, in the Pacific division.

Since joining Canada West and U Sports (then CIS) in 1999, the Spartans have captured 13 U Sports team championships and 32 Canada West team championships. The Spartans men's volleyball team has won six national championships, while the women's soccer team have won five and the women's volleyball team has won two. The men's volleyball team has won 13 U Sports medals, followed by the women's soccer team, who has 10; the women's volleyball team, who has six; the men's soccer team, who has four; the women's cross country team, who has three; the women's track and field team, who has two; and the men's basketball and men's cross country teams, who each have one.

The Spartans are known for their involved fans, who have earned the title of "The Spartan Faithful".

== Varsity sports ==
Men's sports	Women's sports
Basketball	Basketball
Cross country	Cross country
Disc golf	Disc golf
Ice hockey	Ice hockey
Rugby	Rugby 7s
Soccer	Soccer
Track and field	Track and field
Volleyball	Volleyball

=== Men's basketball ===
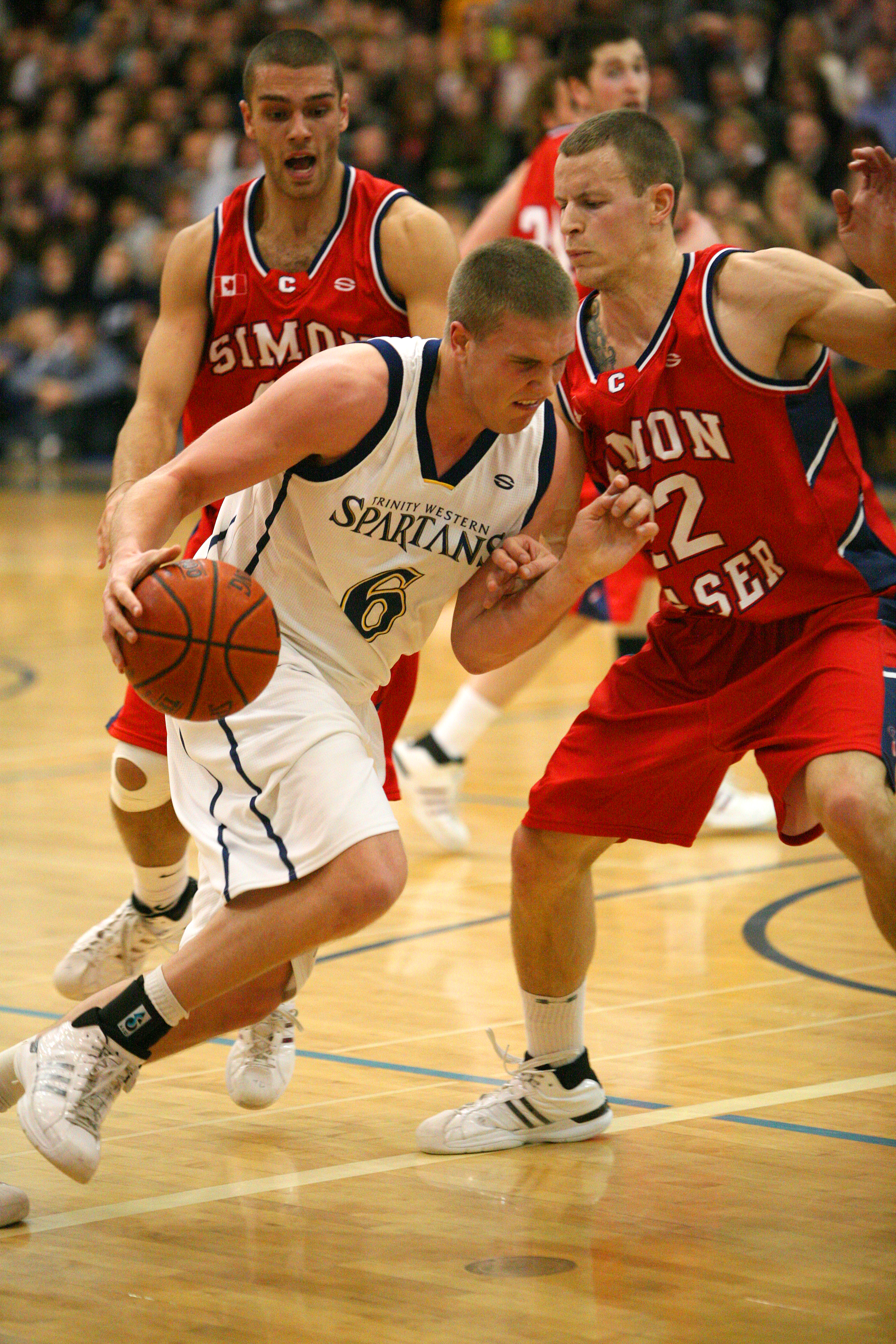
A 2009 men's basketball game between Trinity Western and Simon Fraser

The Trinity Western University men's basketball program made its U Sports (then CIAU) debut in the 1999–00 season. Competing in the Canada West conference, the Spartans have won three Canada West medals, winning bronze in 2003, 2009, and most recently in 2011. The 2011 season proved to be the most successful in program history, as head coach Scott Allen led the Spartans to their first U Sports men's basketball championship tournament in Halifax, N.S., upsetting the number 1-seeded UBC Thunderbirds in the semi-finals to advance to the national final. The Spartans settled for a program-best silver medal after falling to the Carleton Ravens in the championship game. The Spartans men's basketball program has had one U Sports major award winner, with Jacob Doerksen winning the Mike Moser Memorial Trophy as the U Sports Men's Basketball Player of the Year in 2008–09. Since 2019, the Spartans have been led by Head Coach Trevor Pridie.

=== Women's basketball ===
The Spartans women's basketball team has competed in the Canada West conference since joining the league for the 1999–00 season. The program earned a playoff berth in its very first year in Canada West, but it took until 2015–16 before the Spartans won their first-ever playoff game, beating the Victoria Vikes in Game 2 (84–79) of a best-of-three series. The following year, 2016–17, the Spartans won their first-ever playoff series, beating the Brandon Bobcats in a best-of-three first round series (2–1). In 2017–18, the Spartans advanced to their first-ever Canada West semi-final series, eventually settling for fourth place in the conference playoffs. Since 2010, the Spartans have been led by Head Coach Cheryl Jean-Paul, who won her first Canada West Coach of the Year award in 2017–18.

=== Men's cross country ===
The Spartans men's cross country team has competed, in its most recent iteration, in the Canada West conference since 2010. The Spartans also had a varsity cross country team from 1999 to 2003. The Spartans are led by Shane Wiebe, Director and Head Coach of Track and Field and Cross Country, who took over the program in 2018. The Men's Cross Country program saw its greatest team success in the latter years of the 2010s, achieving the program's only U Sports team medal (silver in 2016) and five Canada West team medals since 2012. The program's first-ever Canada West team championship came in 2016, now accompanying their three Canada West silver medals (2013, 2014 and 2015) and a Canada West bronze (2017). Individually, the men's program has achieved one U Sports medal and six Canada West medals. In 2014, TWU student-athlete Mihai Prajea won the program's first U Sports major award, the U Sport Student-Athlete Community Service Award.

=== Women's cross country ===
The Spartans women's cross country team has competed, in its most recent iteration, in the Canada West conference since 2010. The Spartans also had a varsity cross country team from 1999 to 2003. The Spartans are led by Shane Wiebe, Director and Head Coach of Track and Field and Cross Country, who took over the program in 2018. The women's program has earned three U Sports team medals in their history, winning silver in 2014 and 2015, and a bronze in 2016. The programmed has excelled in Canada West competition, winning gold four times (2013, 2014, 2015 and 2016), silver once (2019), and bronze once (2017). Individually, the program achieved its first-ever and only U Sports medal in 2015, when Sarah Inglis captured gold at the national championships. TWU has captured 11 Canada West medals, including a stretch of six years when the Spartans won the conference's individual title fives times (2012, 2013, 2014, 2015 and 2017). The women's team also has won two Canada West silver medals (2014 and 2016), and four Canada West bronze medals (2000, 2015, 2016 and 2019). In 2015, the women's program won its first two U Sports major awards, with Sarah Inglis and Mark Bomba winning the U Sports Athlete of the Year and U Sports Coach of the Year awards, respectively.

=== Men's hockey ===
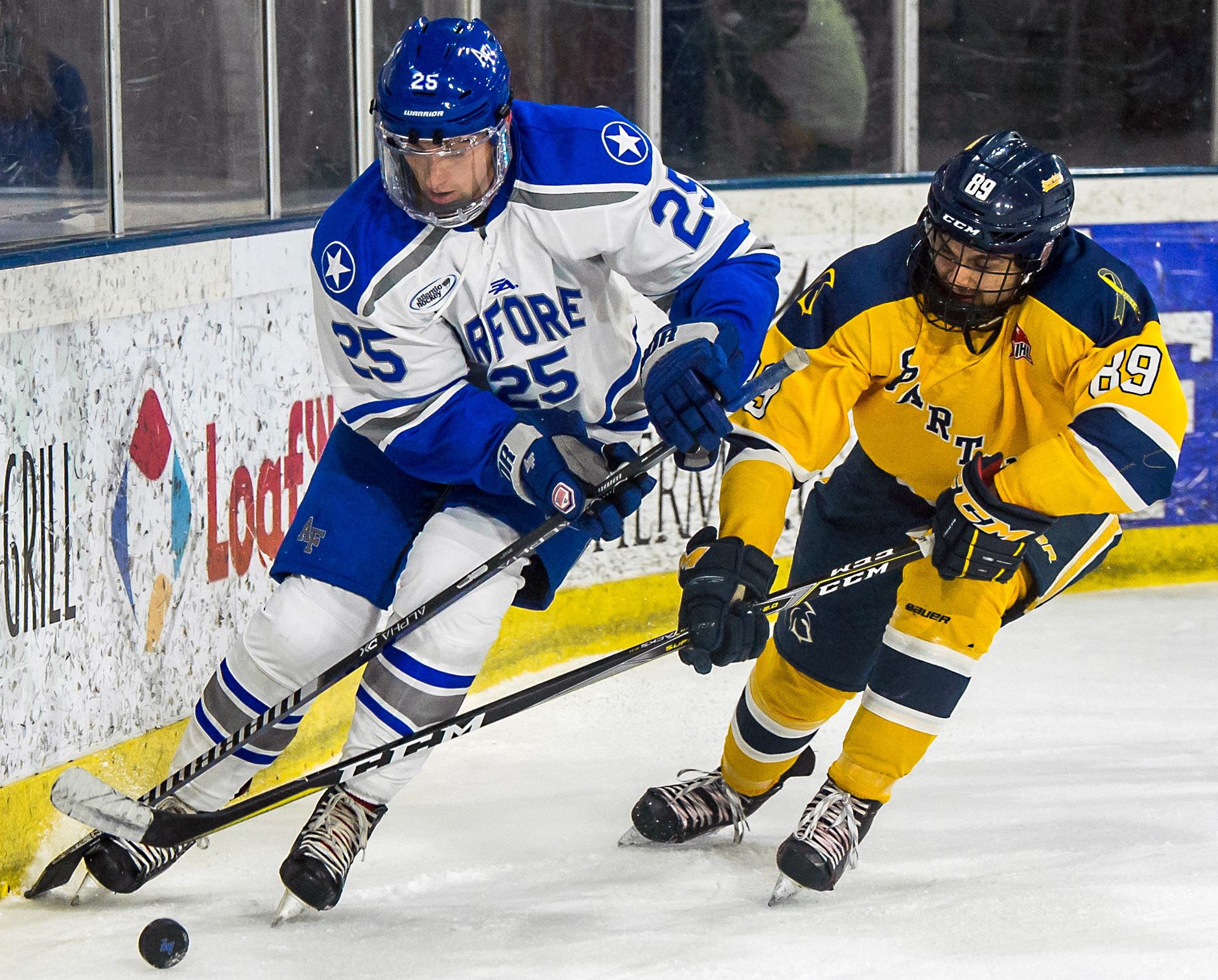
An exhibition game between the Trinity Western and Air Force Falcons men's ice hockey teams in 2019

The Trinity Western Spartans men's hockey program was voted in to join Canada West and U Sports in 2019 and played in its Canada West season in 2021–22. Prior to joining U Sports, the men's hockey program competed in the BCIHL (British Columbia Intercollegiate Hockey League) since 2006–07. During their BCIHL tenure, the Spartans captured 2 BCIHL Championships in 2018 and 2019. The Spartans have been led by Head Coach Barret Kropf since 2013 before his resignation in 2022.

=== Women's hockey ===
The Spartans women's hockey program began competing in Canada West competition in 2021–22. The TWU women's hockey team came under the Spartans umbrella in 2018, competing in the South Coast Women's Hockey League as a non-varsity team before entering Canada West and U Sports. TWU announced Coach Jean Laforest took over as the program's head coach in 2019.

=== Men's rugby ===
Men's rugby at Trinity Western University joined as an official varsity program in 2019. Andrew Evans has served as the Director of Rugby and Head Coach since the program's relaunch. In its first season under Evans, 2019–20, the 15s team beat UBC Okanagan (43–20) in the first game of the latest iteration of the program. The team also won the Shield Championship at the West Coast 7s Treasure Island in San Francisco and finished fourth at the Western Canadian 7s Championship. Prior to its return as a varsity team, there was previously a men's rugby program at TWU from 1988 to 2004, with the team competing at a varsity level from 1996 to 2004.

=== Women's rugby ===
Women's rugby sevens at Trinity Western University joined as an official varsity program in 2019. Posé Seumanutafa is the Women’s 7s coach, with Andrew Evans serving as the Director of Rugby. The Spartans finished 5th in the 2024 Canada West 7s Circuit and finished the 2023–24 season with a silver medal at the Tropical 7s Elite u23 Division, going 5–1 with a narrow 17–7 loss to Harvard University in the final.

=== Men's soccer ===
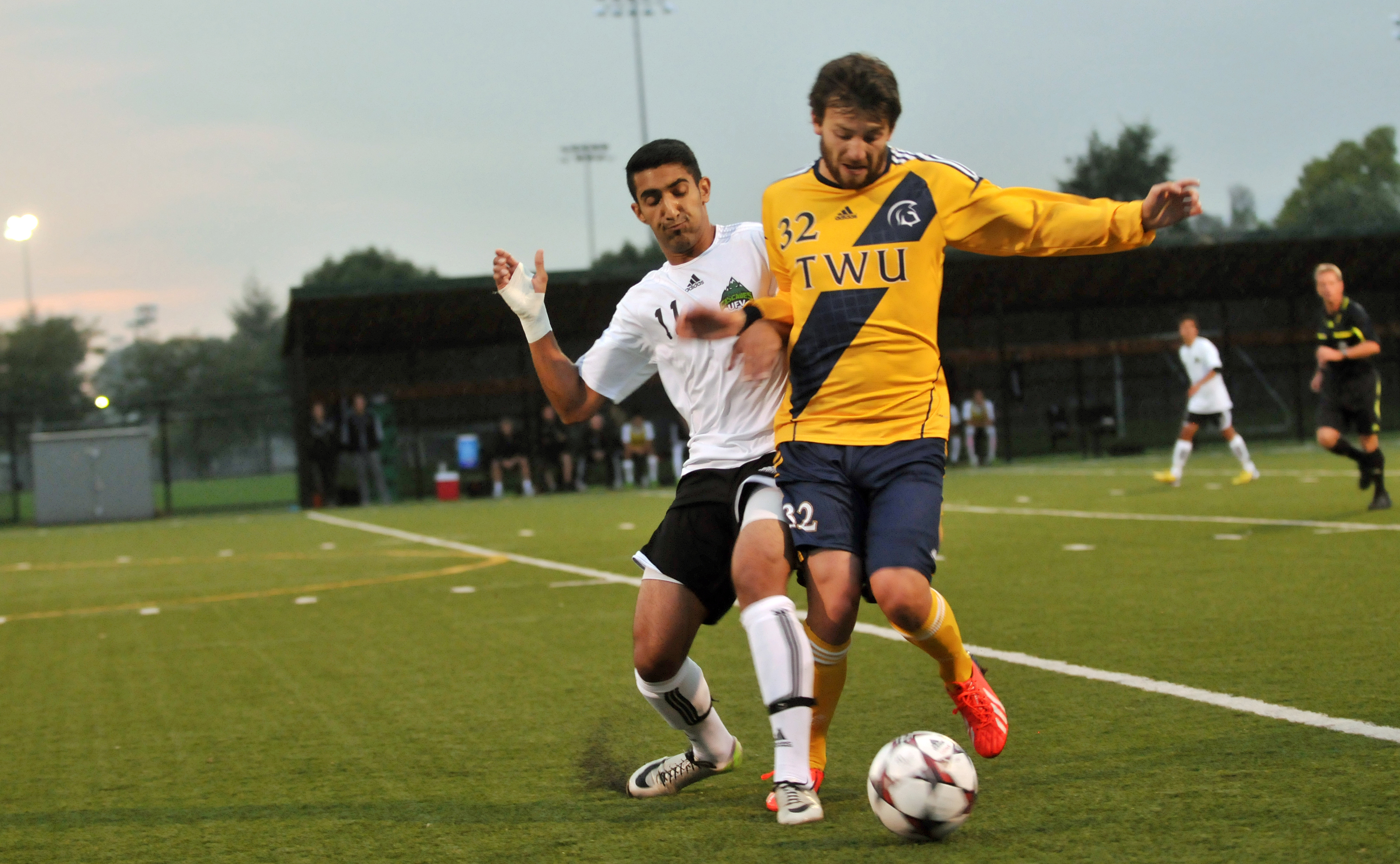
TWU (gold) vs UFV match, 2013

The men's soccer program at Trinity Western University joined Canada West competition in 2001. Prior to joining Canada West and U Sports, the program competed in the BCCAA (British Columbia Colleges’ Athletic Association), which is now the PACWEST (Pacific Western Athletic Association). The program began Canada West competition with Al Alderson as the head coach, serving until 2008, and winning the Canada West Coach of the Year award in 2003. Under Alderson, the program won three U Sports medals, including silver medals in 2006 and 2008 and bronze in 2009. The program also earned three straight Canada West gold medals, in 2005, 2006 and 2007. Under first-year coach Pat Rohla, the team also captured a U Sports bronze medal in 2009.

In total, the program has earned four U Sports medals, and nine Canada West medals, most recently in 2018, when they captured a Canada West silver medal, which earned the team its first trip to the national championship tournament since 2009. The Spartans are currently led by Head Coach Mike Shearon, who assumed head coaching duties in 2016 after the retirement of Pat Rohla. Under Shearon, the program has earned three Canada West medals (silver in 2017 and 2018, and a bronze in 2016), and a fourth-place result at the 2018 U Sports Championship, which included an upset quarter-final win over No. 1-seeded York in a penalty shootout. The program has had three major U Sports award winners in its history with Paul Hamilton and Nick Perugini winning the U Sports Player of the Year award (Joe Johnston Memorial Trophy) in 2009 and 2007, respectively, and Christian Rossi winning the U Sports Rookie of the Year award in 2021.

=== Women's soccer ===
The women's soccer program has seen extended success since joining Canada West and U Sports in 2001. The Spartans have been led by Head Coach Graham Roxburgh since 1999, who coached TWU for two years in the BCCAA before entering U Sports competition. Under Roxburgh, the Spartans have won a total of five national championships (2004, 2008, 2009, 2012 and 2013) and nine Canada West championships (2004, 2006, 2009, 2011, 2012, 2013, 2017, 2018 and 2021). In total, the program has won 10 U Sports medals and 16 Canada West medals. Roxburgh has won the U Sports Coach of the Year award twice, in 2011 and 2021, and the Canada West Coach of the Year award five times (2009, 2011, 2014, 2016 and 2021). When the women's soccer team won the 2004 national championship, the victory marked Trinity Western University's first U Sports Championship. Individually, members of the Spartans women's soccer program have earned multiple individual U Sports awards. This includes three U Sports Player of the Year awards (Chantal Navert Memorial Award) in 2014 (Jessica King), 2018 (Seina Kashima), and 2019 (Jenaya Robertson), and three U Sports Rookie of the Year awards in 2008 (Nikki Wright), 2009 (Alicia Tesan), and 2015 (Rachel Hutchinson).

=== Men's track and field ===
Spartans men's track and field has competed in the Canada West conference, in its most recent iteration, since 2010. The Spartans also had a varsity track and field team from 1999 to 2003. The Spartans are led by Shane Wiebe, Director and Head Coach of Track and Field and Cross Country, who took over the program in 2018. The program has won five Canada West team medals in its history, including a gold medal in 2017, a silver medal in 2014, and three bronze medals, in 2015, 2018 and 2020. The program has won 15 individual U Sports medals and 64 individual Canada West medals. Nathan George captured the school's first-ever U Sports gold medal in 2016, winning the 300m. Since then, Jaime Eduardo Martin Huerta also capture a U Sports gold medal, winning in pole vault in 2022.

=== Women's track and field ===
Spartans women's track and field has competed in the Canada West conference, in its most recent iteration, since 2010. The Spartans also had a varsity track and field team from 1999 to 2003. The Spartans are led by Shane Wiebe, Director and Head Coach of Track and Field and Cross Country, who took over the program in 2018. The women's program has won two U Sports team medals, and two Canada West Team medals, which includes U Sports silver in 2015 and bronze in 2014, and Canada West gold in both 2014 and 2015. The Spartans women's program has won 27 individual U Sports medals, and 76 individual Canada West medals. Laura Wilson won the program's first-ever U Sports gold medal in 2001 when she won the 60m. Since then, TWU has won 11 more individual national titles, with Emma Nuttall and Regan Yee leading the way, with each earning three national championship gold medals.

=== Men's volleyball ===
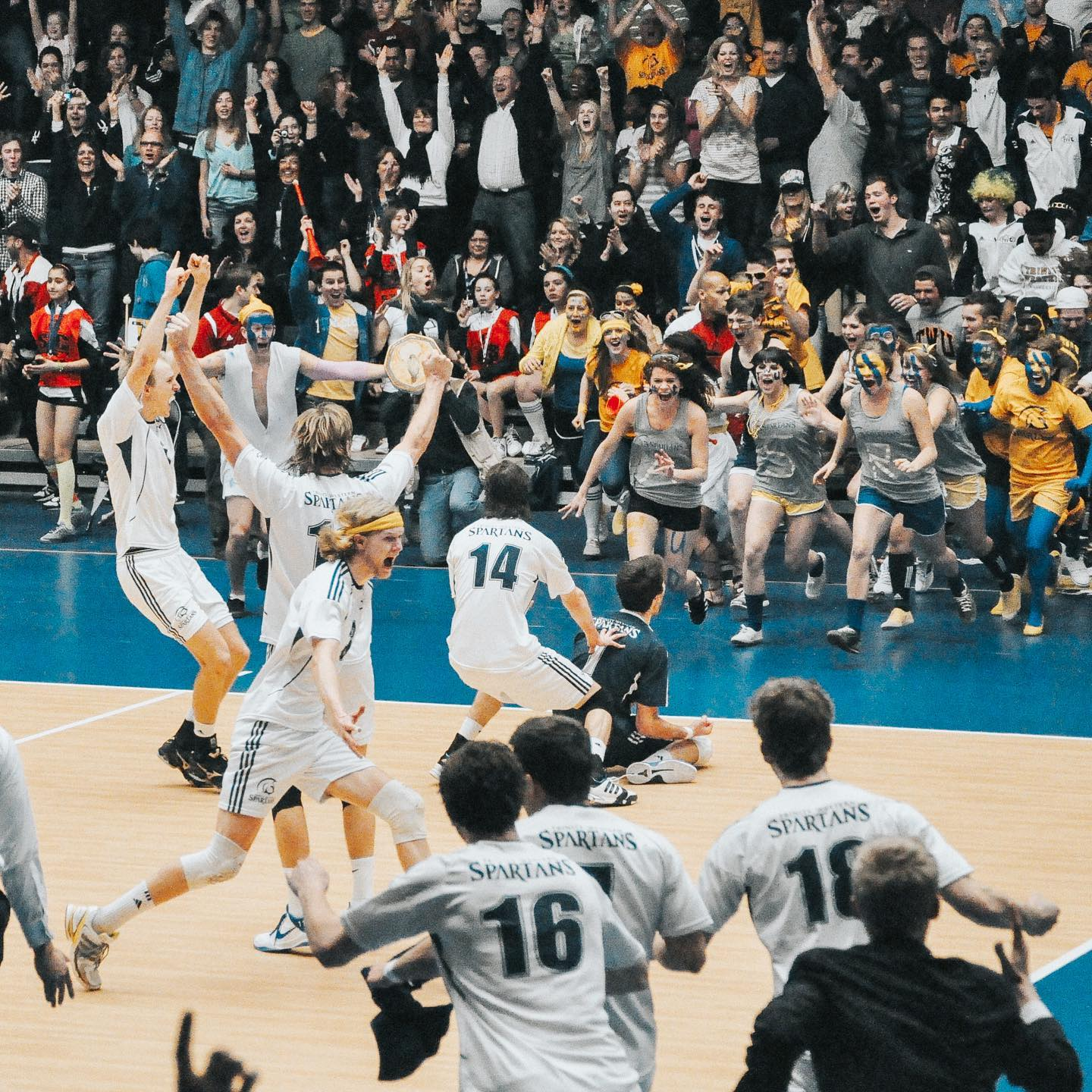
Trinity Western men's volleyball match in 2011

The men's volleyball program at TWU began Canada West and U Sports competition in the 1999–00 season. During the 2005–06 season, the Spartans captured the program's first-ever national championship under then head coach, Ron Pike. In 2007, Ben Josephson took over head coaching duties, and led the program to five more national titles, winning in 2011, 2012, 2016, 2017 and 2019. The program has won the Canada West championship seven times, taking the conference title in 2007, 2012, 2016, 2017, 2018, 2020 and 2022. In his time with the Spartans, Josephson was named U Sports Coach of the Year four times (2011, 2014, 2020 and 2022). The program has produced seven U Sports Player of the Year award winners, including Derek Epp (2021–22), Eric Loeppky (2019–20), Adam Schriemer (2016–17), Ryan Sclater (2016–17), Nick Del Bianco (2014–15), Ben Ball (2011–12) and Josh Howatson (2006–07). The Spartans have also had three winners of the U Sports Rookie of the Year award, including Chris Meehan (2001–02), Adam Schriemer (2013–14) and Eric Loeppky (2016–17).

=== Women's volleyball ===
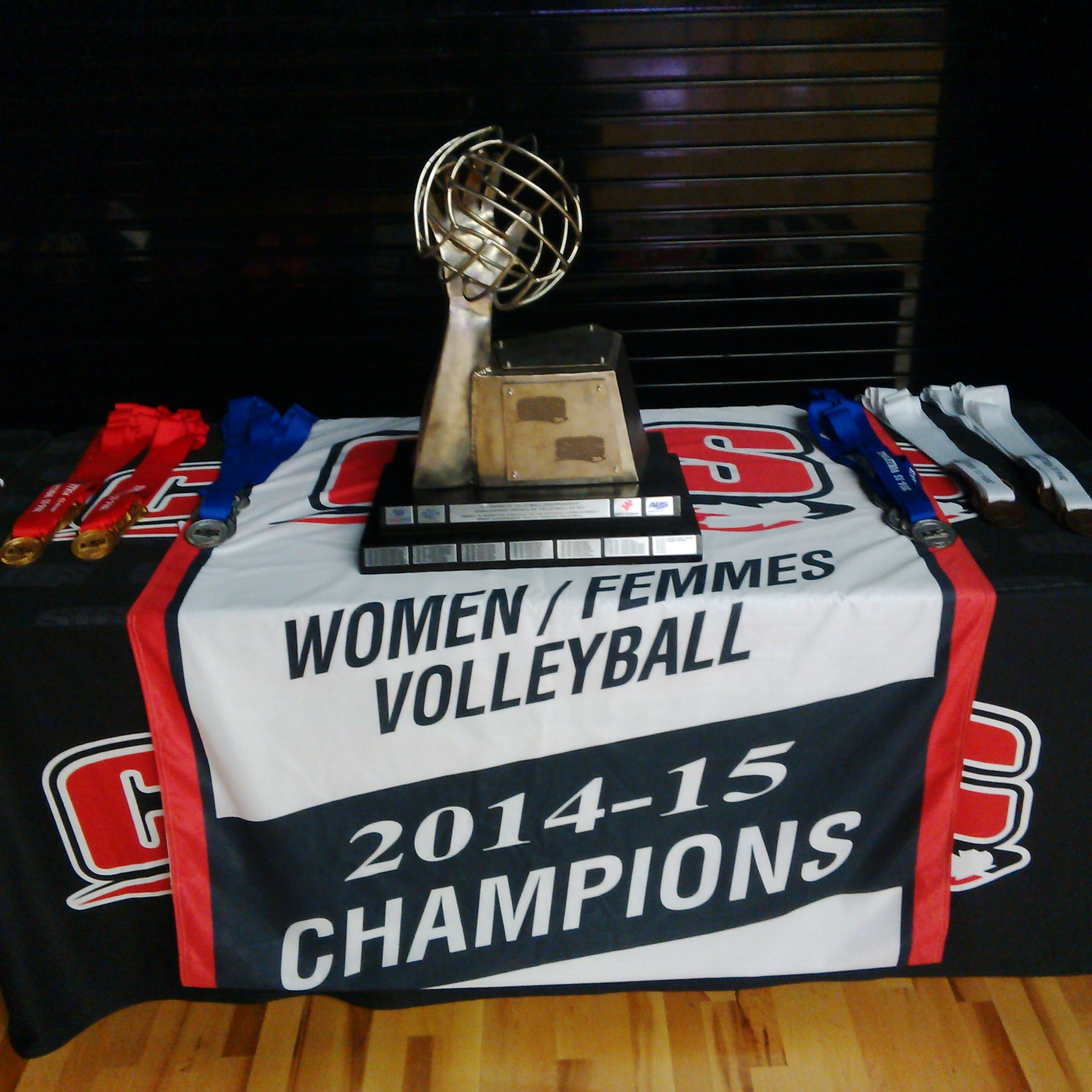
The Spartans won the National Championship for the 2014-15 season

The TWU women's volleyball program joined the Canada West conference and U Sports competition for the 1999–00 season. The program captured its first U Sports medal in 2010–11, winning bronze. The program would go on to win its first U Sports championship in 2014–15. That season, the program won their first of five Canada West championships, going on to win the conference crown in 2014–15, 2015–16, 2018–19, 2019–20 and 2021–22. In 2021–22, the Spartans capture their second U Sports championship. Coach Ryan Hofer has led the program since 2006, being named U Sports Coach of the Year once in his career in 2010–11. Individually, the program has produced three Therese Quigley Award winners (Outstanding Student-Athlete) with Rhonda Schmuland winning in 2005–06, and Saralyn Stel winning in 2007–08.

== National Championships ==
Since 1999, the TWU Spartans have won 13 national championships in three sports and have medaled 40 times in eight sports.

Program	Total	Championship Years
TWU Men's Volleyball	6	2006, 2011, 2012, 2016, 2017, 2019
TWU Women's Soccer	5	2004, 2008, 2009, 2012, 2013
TWU Women's Volleyball	2	2015, 2022

== Canada West Championships ==
Since 1999, the TWU Spartans have won 32 Canada West Championships in eight sports and have medaled 73 times in nine sports.

Program	Total	Championship Years
TWU Women's Soccer	9	2004, 2006, 2009, 2011, 2012, 2014, 2017, 2018, 2021
TWU Men's Volleyball	7	2007, 2012, 2016, 2017, 2018, 2020, 2022
TWU Women's Volleyball	5	2015, 2016, 2019, 2020, 2022
TWU Women's Cross Country	4	2013, 2014, 2015, 2016
TWU Men's Soccer	3	2005, 2006, 2007
TWU Women's Track and Field	2	2014, 2015
TWU Men's Track and Field	1	2017
TWU Men's Cross Country	1	2016

== Lieutenant Governor Athletic Award winners ==
Athletes from Trinity Western University have been nominated on six separate occasions for the Lieutenant Governor Athletic Award (formerly known as the BLG Award), which is given annually to top male and female athletes across all Canadian universities. Chris Meehan (MVB) was nominated in 2005–06, Josh Howatson (MVB) was nominated in 2006–07, Ben Ball (MVB) was nominated in 2011–12, Jessica King (WSOC) was nominated in 2014–15, Ryan Sclater (MVB) was nominated in 2016–17 and Derek Epp (MVB) was nominated in 2021–22. Howatson went on to win the award as the top Male Athlete in Canada in 2006–07.

== Athletic facilities ==
The Spartans compete at three main venues: The Langley Events Centre, Chase Office Field and the David E. Enarson Gymnasium. The Langley Events Centre, a multi-purpose facility in the Township of Langley is the home of TWU's basketball, hockey, rugby and volleyball teams. Chase Office Field is the on-campus home of TWU's soccer programs. The David E. Enarson Gymnasium is the former home of the indoor sports programs, and occasionally hosts preseason or Canada West conference games for TWU's basketball and volleyball teams. The Spartans have hosted the National Championships on three occasions in two sports. Chase Office Field (then Rogers Field) hosted the CIS (now U Sports) Women's Soccer Championship in 2008 and the CIS (now U Sports) Men's Soccer Championship in 2009. TWU also hosted the CIS (now U Sports) Men's Volleyball Championship in 2011. In both 2008, in women's soccer, and in 2011, in men's volleyball, the Spartans won the national championship in front of their home crowd. In 2009, the Spartans men's soccer team won bronze when hosting the national tournament.

== Awards and honours ==
- Alicia Perrin, Canada's Flag Bearer for the opening ceremony of the 28th Summer Universiade (2015)

=== Complete Champion Award winners ===
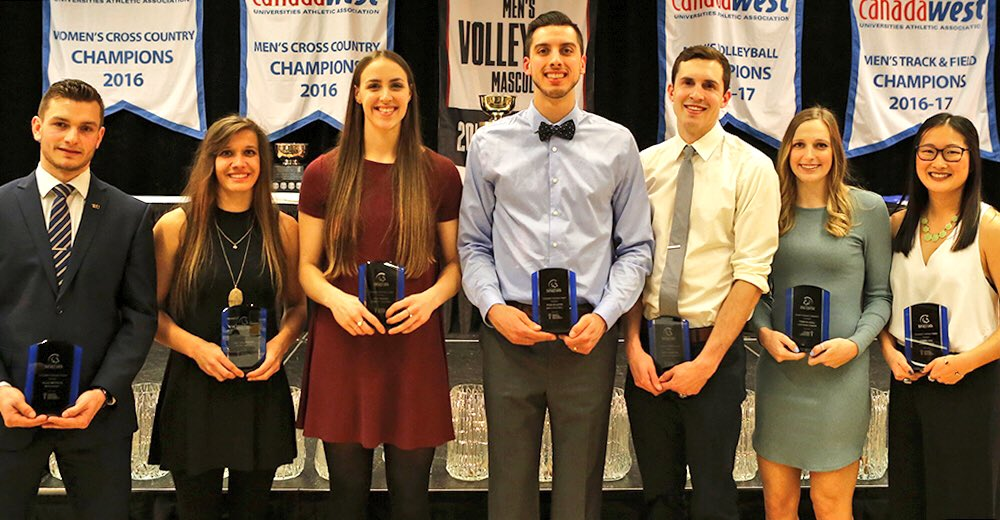
2017 CCA Winners: Matthys, Williamson, Wendel, Sclater, Plocktis, Schmidt and Chin

Spartan Athletics is focused on developing Complete Champions through the Complete Champion Approach (CCA). The CCA helps Spartan student-athletes become Champions in all areas of their lives by focusing on whole person development. As such, since 2003–04, the Spartans Athletic department distributes a prestigious annual award, the Complete Champion Award, to male and female athletes who exemplify what it means to be a Complete Champion.

Season	Female CCA Award Winners	Male CCA Award Winners
2003–04	Lies Verhoeff (WVB)	Chris Meehan (MVB)
2004–05	Kristi Haukeland (WSOC)	Jaben Schalk (MVB)
2005–06	Rhonda Schmuland (WVB); Angela Trauter (WSOC)	Paul Ballard (MSOC); Chris Meehan (MVB)
2006–07	None awarded	Josh Howatson (MVB); Jeff Stel (MVB)
2007–08	Saralyn Stel (WVB); Whitney Agassiz (WSOC); Erin-Marie Higgins (WSOC)	None awarded
2008–09	Dayna Jansen Van Doorn (WVB); Dana DuMerton (WSOC)	Chaim Schalk (MVB)
2009–10	Kara Jansen Van Doorn (WVB); Becca Ferguson (WSOC)	Josh Doornenbal (MVB); Jacob Doerksen (MBB)
2011–12	Melissa Mobilio (WSOC); Daniela Gerig (WSOC)	Marc Howatson (MVB); Rudy Verhoeff (MVB)
2012–13	None Awarded	Jarrod Offereins (MVB)
2013–14	Natalie Boyd (WSOC); Colleen Webber (WSOC)	Lucas Van Berkel (MVB)
2014–15	Kristen Santema (WSOC); Alison Jackson (WTF/XC); Fiona Benson (WTF/XC)	None Awarded
2015–16	Allessandra Oliverio (WSOC)	Tyler Koslowsky (MVB)
2016–17	Ally Williamson (WSOC); Steph Chin (WSOC); Elly Wendel (WVB); Luca Schmidt (WBB)	Scott Plocktis (MVB); Ryan Sclater (MVB); Silas Matthys (MHOC)
2017–18	Katie Devaney (WVB)	Dirk De Waal (MHOC); Stefan Gonzales (MHOC); David Boyd (MTF)
2018–19	Amay Gartke (WSOC); Tessa Ratzlaff (WBB); Sarah Buckingham (WBB); Mirelle Martens (WTF/XC); Madison Evans (WTF)	Carter Bergen (MVB); Aaron Boettcher (MVB); Kaleb Denham (MHOC)
2019–20	Jenaya Robertson (WSOC); Mowa Adeleye (WTF)	Jacob Kern (MVB); Pearson Eshenko (MVB); Eric Loeppky (MVB); Nicolas Colyn (MTF/XC)
2020–21	Hilary Howe (WVB); Jen Kits (WT&F/XC)	Jarrett Fontaine (MHKY)
2021–22	Olivia Heinen (WVB); Avery Heppell (WVB); Elizabeth Hicks (WSOC); Grace Konrad (WT&F)	Colton Loewen (MVB); Brayden Brown (MHKY); Spencer Gerth (MHKY)

=== Canada West Hall of Fame ===
- Paul Hamilton, Soccer: Canada West Hall of Fame - 2019 Inductee
- Nick Perugini, Soccer: Canada West Hall of Fame - 2019 Inductee
- Natalie Boyd, Soccer: Canada West Hall of Fame - 2019 Inductee
- Kristen Funk, Soccer: Canada West Hall of Fame - 2019 Inductee
- Josh Howatson, Volleyball: Canada West Hall of Fame - 2019 Inductee
- Nick Del Bianco, Volleyball: Canada West Hall of Fame - 2021 Inductee
- Nikki Wright, Soccer: Canada West Hall of Fame - 2022 Inductee

== Fight song ==
Here we go, Here we go, Here we go,

Team Spartan, we’re the Best,
We all know

We’re the Team,
We’re Supreme,
Number One

And we love you,
Team Spartan!
Oy! Oy! Oy!

== Alumni ==
- Elijah Adekugbe – professional soccer player
- Paul Hamilton – professional soccer player
- Josh Howatson – professional volleyball player, Canadian Men's National Team
- Alison Jackson – professional cyclist, 2020 Olympian
- Brie O'Reilly – professional volleyball player, Canadian Women's National Team
- Steven Marshall – professional volleyball player, Canadian Men's National Team, 2016 and 2020 Olympian
- Emma Nuttall – British track and field athlete
- Lauren O'Reilly – professional volleyball player, Canadian Women's National Team
- Jake Ruby – professional soccer player
- Chaim Schalk – professional beach volleyball player, 2016 Olympian
- Adam Schriemer – professional volleyball player
- Ryan Sclater – professional volleyball player, Canadian Men's National Team, 2020 Olympian
- Lucas Van Berkel – professional volleyball player, Canadian Men's National Team
- Daniel Jansen Van Doorn - professional volleyball player, Canadian Men's National Team, 2016 Olympian
- Rudy Verhoeff – professional volleyball player, Canadian Men's National Team, 2016 Olympian
- Joel Waterman – professional soccer player
- Regan Yee – Canadian track and field athlete, 2020 Olympian
- Joel Waterman - professional soccer player, Canadian Men's National Team
