= Pearson Eshenko =

Canadian volleyball player (born 1997)

Personal information
- Nickname: Pearce
- Born: 16 October 1997 (age 29); Banff, Alberta, Canada
- Height: 2.05 m (6 ft 9 in)
- Weight: 97 kg (214 lb)
- Spike: 363 cm (143 in)
- Block: 343 cm (135 in)
- Education: Trinity Western University

Volleyball information
- Position: Middle blocker
- Current club: Stade Poitevin Poitiers

Career
Years	Teams
2015–2020; 2020–2021; 2021–2023; 2023–2025; 2025–	TWU Spartans; Helios Grizzlys Giesen; SVG Lüneburg; S.L. Benfica; Stade Poitevin Poitiers

National team
2016; 2021–	Canada U21; Canada
Honours
Men's volleyball
Representing Canada
NORCECA Championship
Silver medal – second place	2021 Durango City
Silver medal – second place	2023 Charleston
- Last updated: 8 July 2025

Pearson Eshenko (born 16 October 1997) is a Canadian volleyball player. He is a member of the Canadian national team and has competed for Canada at the 2023 FIVB Volleyball Men's Olympic Qualification Tournaments.

== Career ==
Eshenko played university volleyball at Trinity Western University for the TWU Spartans. While playing for the Spartans, he won the U Sports National Championship three times.

== Honours ==
=== College ===
- Domestic
  - 2015–16 CIS Championship, with Trinity Western Spartans
  - 2016–17 U Sports Championship, with Trinity Western Spartans
  - 2017–18 U Sports Championship, with Trinity Western Spartans
  - 2018–19 U Sports Championship, with Trinity Western Spartans
