= Eric Loeppky =

Canadian volleyball player (born 1998)

Personal information
- Born: 1 August 1998 (age 28); Winnipeg, Manitoba, Canada
- Hometown: Steinbach, Manitoba, Canada
- Height: 1.97 m (6 ft 6 in)
- Weight: 89 kg (196 lb)
- Spike: 348 cm (137 in)
- Block: 328 cm (129 in)
- Education: Trinity Western University

Volleyball information
- Position: Outside hitter
- Current club: Volley Lube
- Number: 4

Career
Years	Teams
2016–2020; 2020–2021; 2021–2022; 2022–2023; 2023–2024; 2024–	Trinity Western Spartans; Consar Ravenna; Pallavolo Padova; Prisma Volley; Vero Volley Monza; Volley Lube

National team
2016–2017; 2018–	Canada U21; Canada
Honours
Men's volleyball
Representing Canada
NORCECA Championship
Silver medal – second place	2021 Durango City
Silver medal – second place	2023 Charleston
- Last updated: 2024-07-29

Eric Loeppky (born 1 August 1998) is a Canadian volleyball player and member of the Canadian national team. He represented Canada at the 2024 Summer Olympics.

== Career ==
Loeppky started playing volleyball at a young age and helped lead the Steinbach Regional Secondary School Sabres to their first AAAA provincial volleyball title in 2014, the top high school league in the province of Manitoba. After high school he went to play volleyball with the Trinity Western University Spartans. Loeppky joined the men's national team and helped the team to qualify for the 2024 Summer Olympics at the 2023 FIVB Volleyball Men's Olympic Qualification Tournaments. Following his qualification to the Olympics, he told CTV Winnipeg that it was his childhood dream come true, saying that "for it to finally be true is pretty surreal. Reflecting on all the time and hours and money and just energy put towards this thing, it feels like it just all came together in this one game. It was pretty, pretty special."

== Personal life ==
He is married to American national volleyball player Samantha Seliger-Swanson and they live together in Italy with their family where Loeppky plays professionally.

== Honours ==
=== College ===
- Domestic
  - 2016–17 U Sports Championship, with Trinity Western Spartans
  - 2017–18 U Sports Championship, with Trinity Western Spartans
  - 2018–19 U Sports Championship, with Trinity Western Spartans

=== Club ===
- Continental
  - 2023–24 CEV Challenge Cup, with Vero Volley Monza
- Domestic
  - 2023–24 Italian League, with Vero Volley Monza
  - 2023–24 Italian Cup, with Vero Volley Monza

=== Individual awards ===
- 2018–19: U Sports Championship – MVP
