= 2011 FIVB Volleyball Men's Club World Championship squads =

This article shows all participating team squads at the 2011 FIVB Volleyball Men's Club World Championship, held from October 8 to 14, 2011 in Doha, Qatar.

== Pool A ==
=== Jastrzębski Węgiel ===
- Head coach: (Italy) Lorenzo Bernardi

Number	Player	Position
1	(Italy) Michał Łasko	Opposite hitter
2	(Brazil) Vinhedo	Setter
3	(Brazil) Nemer	Outside hitter
6	(Poland) Mateusz Malinowski	Opposite hitter
7	(Poland) Pawel Rusek	Libero
9	(Poland) Zbigniew Bartman (c)	Outside hitter
10	(Poland) Bartosz Gawryszewski	Middle blocker
11	(United States) Brian Thorton	Setter
13	(Poland) Michał Kubiak	Outside hitter
15	(United States) Russell Holmes	Middle blocker
17	(Netherlands) Rob Bontje	Middle blocker
18	(Brazil) Luciano Paczko Bozko	Outside hitter

=== Trinity Western Spartans ===
- Head coach: (Canada) Ben Josephson

Number	Player	Position
1	(Canada) Jarrod Offereins	Libero
3	(Canada) Mark Howatson	Outside hitter
4	(Canada) Devyn Plett	Setter
6	(Canada) Daniel Jansen Van Doorn	Middle blocker
8	(Canada) Steven Marshall	Outside hitter
9	(Canada) Brad Kufske	Outside hitter
11	(Canada) Rudy Verhoeff (c)	Opposite hitter
12	(Canada) Lukas Van Berkel	Middle blocker
13	(Canada) Branden Schmidt	Middle blocker
14	(Canada) Ben Ball	Setter
16	(Canada) Derek Thiessen	Outside hitter
18	(Canada) Nick Del Bianco	Outside hitter

=== Zenit Kazan ===
- Head coach: (Russia) Vladimir Alenko

Number	Player	Position
3	(Russia) Nikolay Apalikov	Middle blocker
5	(Italy) Valerio Vermiglio	Setter
6	(Russia) Evgeny Sivozhelez	Opposite hitter
7	(Russia) Aleksandr Volkov	Middle blocker
8	(United States) William Priddy	Outside hitter
9	(Russia) Alexei Cheremisin	Opposite hitter
10	(Russia) Yury Berezhko (c)	Outside hitter
12	(Russia) Alexei Bebeshin	Setter
15	(Russia) Alexey Obomochaev	Libero
16	(Russia) Alexander Gutsalyuk	Middle blocker
17	(Russia) Vladislav Babichev	Libero
18	(Russia) Maxim Mikhaylov	Opposite hitter

=== Paykan Tehran ===
- Head coach: (Iran) Peyman Akbari

Number	Player	Position
2	(Iran) Reza Safaei	Opposite hitter
3	(Iran) Davoud Moghbeli	Middle blocker
6	(Iran) Hesam Bakhsheshi (c)	Middle blocker
7	(Iran) Ali Hossein	Libero
8	(Iran) Alireza Mobasheri	Outside hitter
10	(Iran) Mohsen Andalib	Opposite hitter
11	(Iran) Rahman Davoudi	Outside hitter
14	(Iran) Parviz Pezeshki	Setter
15	(France) Philippe Barca-Cysique	Outside hitter
16	(Iran) Vali Nourmohammadi	Middle blocker
17	(Iran) Mohammed Taher Vadi	Setter
18	(Lebanon) Jean Abi Chedid	Outside hitter

== Pool B ==
=== Trentino Diatec ===
- Head coach: (Bulgaria) Radostin Stoytchev

Number	Player	Position
1	(Bulgaria) Matey Kaziyski (c)	Outside hitter
3	(Italy) Emanuele Birarelli	Middle blocker
4	(Italy) Dore Della Lunga	Outside hitter
5	(Cuba) Osmany Juantorena	Outside hitter
6	(Poland) Łukasz Żygadło	Setter
7	(Brazil) Raphael	Setter
11	(Bulgaria) Tsvetan Sokolov	Opposite hitter
12	(Greece) Mitar Djuric	Middle blocker
13	(Italy) Massimo Colaci	Outside hitter
14	(Czech Republic) Jan Štokr	Opposite hitter
16	(Italy) Andrea Bari	Libero
17	(Italy) Matteo Burgsthaler	Middle blocker

=== Al-Ahly ===
- Head coach: (Egypt) Ibrahim Fakhr Mohamed

Number	Player	Position
1	(Egypt) Abdel Latif Ahmed	Middle blocker
2	(Egypt) Abdallah Abdalsalam Bekhit (c)	Setter
4	(Egypt) Ahmed Abdelhay	Outside hitter
5	(Egypt) Magdy	Libero
7	(Egypt) Raouf	Outside hitter
8	(Egypt) Mohamed Ketat	Middle blocker
10	(Slovakia) Vladimir Katona	Outside hitter
11	(Egypt) Ahmed Abdelaal	Opposite hitter
13	(Egypt) Abou Abd Elahim	Middle blocker
14	(Serbia) Miloš Antonić	Setter
15	(Egypt) Ahmed Elkotb	Opposite hitter
17	(Egypt) Mohamed Elmetwaly	Middle blocker

=== SESI São Paulo ===
- Head coach: (Brazil) Giovane Gávio

Number	Player	Position
3	(Brazil) Léo	Opposite hitter
4	(Brazil) Leo Mineiro	Outside hitter
5	(Brazil) Sandro	Setter
6	(Brazil) Jotinha	Setter
7	(Brazil) Diogo	Outside hitter
8	(Brazil) Murilo (c)	Outside hitter
9	(Brazil) Sidão	Middle blocker
10	(Brazil) Sérgio	Libero
13	(Brazil) Tiago	Middle blocker
14	(Brazil) Rodrigão	Middle blocker
17	(Brazil) Japa	Outside hitter
18	(Brazil) Wallace	Opposite hitter

=== Al-Arabi ===
- Head coach: (Algeria) Adel Sennoun

Number	Player	Position
2	(Czech Republic) Jiří Popelka	Outside hitter
3	(Qatar) Saeed (c)	Outside hitter
4	(Brazil) Renan	Libero
6	(Germany) Christian Pampel	Opposite hitter
7	(Qatar) Mohammad	Middle blocker
8	(Italy) Davide Saitta	Setter
9	(Italy) Gianluca Saraceni	Outside hitter
10	(Qatar) Hisham Amro	Middle blocker
11	(Poland) Łukasz Kadziewicz	Middle blocker
12	(Netherlands) Tije Vlam	Middle blocker
14	(Qatar) Saoud Abdelaziz	Outside hitter
18	(Qatar) Alhitimi Saed	Setter
