= U Sports Men's Volleyball Player of the Year =

Player of the Year Award
- Sport: Indoor volleyball
- League: U Sports
- First awarded: 1980 to Terry Danyluk
- Most recent: Mason Greves, UBC Thunderbirds
- Website: usports.ca

The U Sports Men's Volleyball Player of the Year is awarded annually to the men's volleyball player of the year in U Sports (previously named Canadian Interuniversity Sport). No player has won the award more than twice and only three players have accomplished the feat (Terry Danyluk in 1980 and 1981; Darcy Busse in 1984 and 1986; Isaac Heslinga in 2024 and 2025). The Alberta Golden Bears program has featured the most winners with 12 and nine of those recipients were either coached by Danyluk or were Danyluk himself. Following the cancellation of the 2020-21 season due to the COVID-19 pandemic, there was no award winner in 2021.

== List of winners ==
Season	Winner	Team
1979-80	Terry Danyluk	Alberta Golden Bears
1980-81	Terry Danyluk	Alberta Golden Bears
1981-82	Mark Kolodziej	Dinosaurs
1982-83	Paul Paquin	Manitoba Bisons
1983-84	Darcy Busse	Saskatchewan Huskies
1984-85	Terry Gagnon	Manitoba Bisons
1985-86	Darcy Busse	Saskatchewan Huskies
1986-87	Michael Stephens	Winnipeg Wesmen
1987-88	Gino Brousseau	Laval Rouge et Or
1988-89	Randy Gingera	Dinosaurs
1989-90	Dale Iwanoczko	Manitoba Bisons
1990-91	Tom Elser	Manitoba Bisons
1991-92	Marc Dunn	Toronto Varsity Blues
1992-93	Rob Olfert	Winnipeg Wesmen
1993-94	Michel Cazes	Laval Rouge et Or
1994-95	Scott Koskie	Manitoba Bisons
1995-96	François Bilodeau	Laval Rouge et Or
1996-97	Doug Bruce	Alberta Golden Bears
1997-98	Jean Sébastien Nault	Sherbrooke Vert et Or
1998-99	Murray Grapentine	Alberta Golden Bears
1999-00	Mark Gradt	Winnipeg Wesmen
2000-01	Brian Enns	Manitoba Bisons
2001-02	Denis Zhukov	Calgary Dinos
2002-03	Pascal Cardinal	Alberta Golden Bears
2003-04	Adam Ens	Saskatchewan Huskies
2004-05	Nicholas Cundy	Alberta Golden Bears
2005-06	Mark Dodds	Saskatchewan Huskies
2006-07	Josh Howatson	Trinity Western Spartans
2007-08	Ben Schellenberg	Winnipeg Wesmen
2008-09	Joel Schmuland	Alberta Golden Bears
2009-10	Paul Sanderson	Brandon Bobcats
2010-11	Graham Vigrass	Calgary Dinos
2011-12	Ben Ball	Trinity Western Spartans
2012-13	Mitch Irvine	Alberta Golden Bears
2013-14	Brad Gunter	Thompson Rivers WolfPack
2014-15	Nick Del Bianco	Trinity Western Spartans
2015-16	Brett Walsh	Alberta Golden Bears
2016-17	Ryan Sclater	Trinity Western Spartans
2017-18	Adam Schriemer	Trinity Western Spartans
2018-19	Elliot Viles	Brandon Bobcats
2019-20	Eric Loeppky	Trinity Western Spartans
2020-21	Not awarded due to the COVID-19 pandemic	
2021-22	Derek Epp	Trinity Western Spartans
2022-23	Jordan Canham	Alberta Golden Bears
2023-24	Isaac Heslinga	Alberta Golden Bears
2024-25	Isaac Heslinga	Alberta Golden Bears
2025-26	Mason Greves	UBC Thunderbirds
