= Danny Demyanenko =

Canadian volleyball player (born 1994)

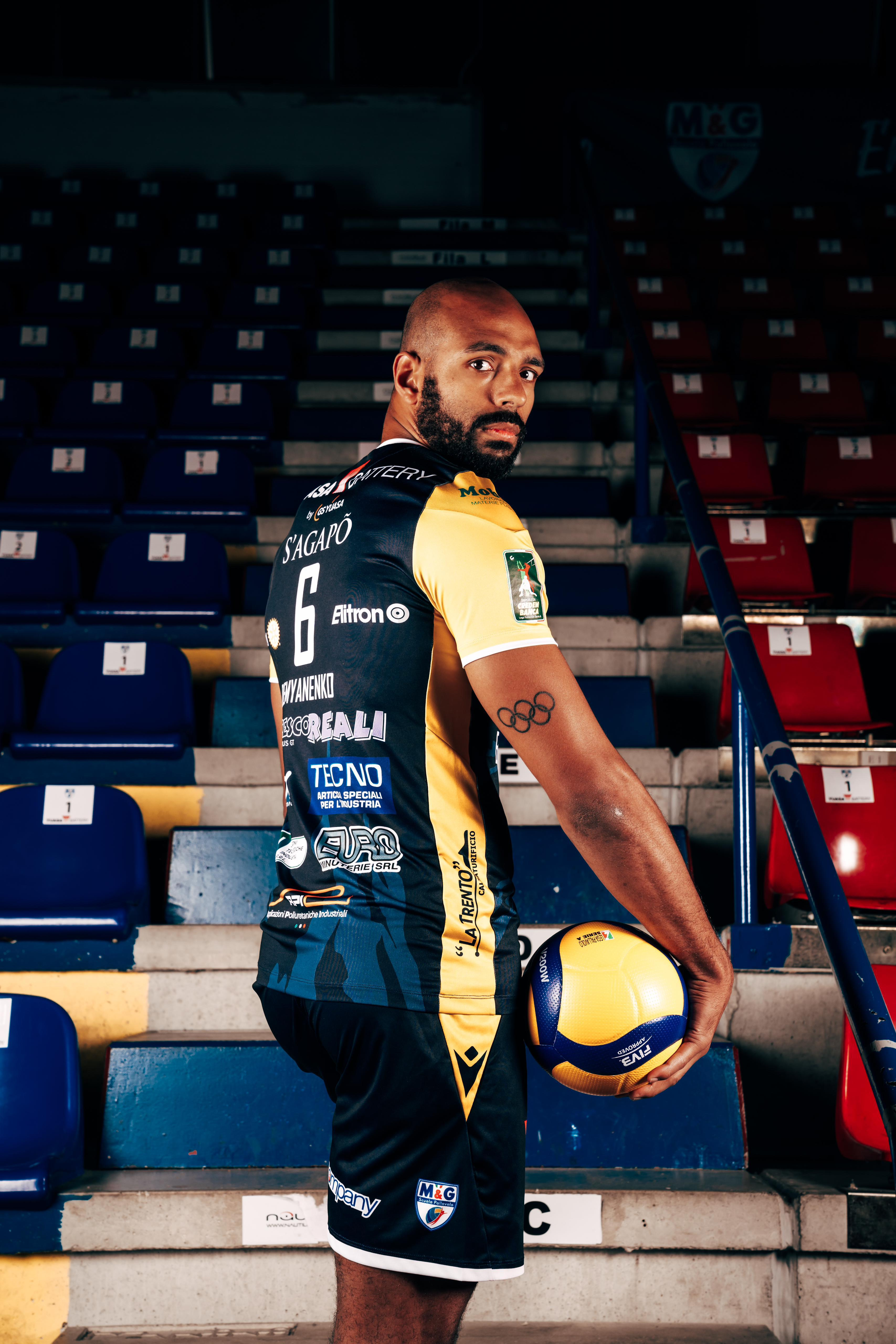
- Demyanenko in 2024

Personal information
- Nationality: Canadian
- Born: 13 July 1994 (age 32); Toronto, Ontario
- Hometown: Toronto, Ontario
- Height: 1.96 m (6 ft 5 in)
- Weight: 101 kg (223 lb)
- Spike: 357 cm (141 in)
- Block: 325 cm (128 in)
- Education: McMaster University

Volleyball information
- Position: Middle blocker
- Current club: Asseco Resovia
- Number: 6

Career
| Years | Teams |
|---|---|
| 2012–2017; 2017–2020; 2020–2024; 2024–2025; 2025– | McMaster Marauders; Spacer's Toulouse Volley; Montpellier Volley; Yuasa Battery Grottazzolina; Assesco Resovia |

National team
| 2012–2013; 2017– | Canada U21; Canada |
Honours
Men's volleyball
Representing Canada
NORCECA Championship
| Silver medal – second place | 2021 Durango City |
| Silver medal – second place | 2023 Charleston |

Danny Demyanenko (born 13 July 1994) is a Canadian volleyball player. He is a member of the Canadian national team and competed for Canada at the 2023 FIVB Volleyball Men's Olympic Qualification Tournaments as they qualified for the 2024 Summer Olympics.

== Career ==
=== National team ===
Demyanenko played for Canada in the 2021 and 2023 NORCECA Continental Championships.

== Personal life ==
Demyanenko was born in Canada and is of Dominican and Ukrainian descent.

== Honours ==
=== College ===
- Domestic
  - 2012–13 CIS Championship, with McMaster Marauders
  - 2013–14 CIS Championship, with McMaster Marauders
  - 2014–15 CIS Championship, with McMaster Marauders
  - 2015–16 CIS Championship, with McMaster Marauders
  - 2016–17 U Sports Championship, with McMaster Marauders
- Domestic
  - 2020–21 French Ligue A, with Montpellier Volley
  - 2021–22 French Ligue A, with Montpellier Volley
  - 2022–23 French Supercup, with Montpellier Volley
  - 2023–24 French Cup, with Montpellier Volley

=== Individual awards ===
- 2023: NORCECA Championship – Best middle blocker
