= Brett Walsh =

Canadian volleyball player (born 1994)

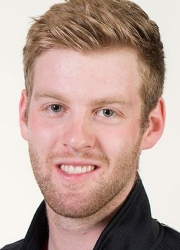
- Walsh in 2017

Personal information
- Full name: Brett James Walsh
- Born: February 19, 1994 (age 32); Calgary, Alberta, Canada
- Hometown: Calgary, Alberta
- Height: 1.95 m (6 ft 5 in)
- Weight: 84 kg (185 lb)
- Spike: 347 cm (137 in)
- Block: 315 cm (124 in)
- Education: University of Alberta

Volleyball information
- Position: Setter
- Current club: Poitiers
- Number: 8

Career
Years	Teams
2012–2017; 2017–2018; 2018–2020; 2020–2021; 2021–2023; 2023–	Alberta Golden Bears; Gi Group Monza; Knack Roeselare; Halkbank Ankara; PAOK Thessaloniki; Poitiers

National team
2016–	Canada
Honours
Men's Volleyball
Representing Canada
FIVB World League
Bronze medal – third place	2017 Curitiba	Team
NORCECA Championship
Silver medal – second place	2021 Durango City
Silver medal – second place	2023 Charleston
Bronze medal – third place	2017 Colorado Springs
Bronze medal – third place	2019 Winnipeg
- Last updated: August 14, 2024

Brett James Walsh (born February 19, 1994) is a Canadian professional volleyball player. He is a member of the Canada men's national volleyball team, representing Canada at the 2024 Summer Olympics.

== Career ==
=== Club ===
He played university volleyball for the Alberta Golden Bears where he won National Championships in 2014 and 2015 and was named the CIS Men's Volleyball Player of the Year in 2016.

=== National team ===
Walsh first played for Canada in 2016, and was named to the 2016 FIVB Volleyball World League squad.

He was a member of Canada's squad for the 2022 FIVB World Championship, as well as the 2024 Summer Olympics.

== Honours ==
=== College ===
  - 2013–14 CIS Men's Volleyball Championship, with Alberta Golden Bears
  - 2014–15 CIS Men's Volleyball Championship, with Alberta Golden Bears
  - 2015–16 CIS Men's Volleyball Championship, with Alberta Golden Bears
  - 2016–17 U Sports Men's Volleyball Championship, with Alberta Golden Bears

=== Individual ===
- 2015: CIS Men's Volleyball Championship - MVP
