= 2023 U Sports Men's Volleyball Championship =

Canadian university volleyball championship

- Season: 2022–23
- Teams: Eight
- Finals site: Burridge Gymnasium; Hamilton, Ontario
- Champions: Trinity Western Spartans (7 title)
- Runner-up: Sherbrooke Vert et Or
- Winning coach: Adam Schriemer/Ben Ball (1 title)
- Championship MVP: Mathias Elser (Trinity Western Spartans)
- Television: CBC; Stephen Clark (play-by-play); Matthew Davison (play-by-play); Kyle Compeau (color analyst); Everett Delorme (color analyst)

The 2023 U Sports Men's Volleyball Championship was the 56th edition of the U Sports men's volleyball championship, a postseason tournament to determine the national champion of the 2023 U Sports men's volleyball season. The tournament started on March 17 and ended with the bronze-medal and championship games being played on March 19 in Hamilton, Ontario.

The third-seeded Trinity Western Spartans defeated the fourth-seeded Sherbrooke Vert et Or in straight sets to claim the seventh championship in program history.

== Host ==
The tournament was hosted by McMaster University at the Burridge Gymnasium on the school's campus. This was the sixth time that McMaster had hosted the tournament with the most recent occurring in 2018.

== Participating teams ==
| Seed | Team | Qualified | Record | Last | Total |
|---|---|---|---|---|---|
| 1 | Alberta Golden Bears | Canada West Champion | 22–2 | 2022 | 9 |
| 2 | McMaster Marauders | OUA Champion (Host) | 18–2 | None | 0 |
| 3 | Trinity Western Spartans | Canada West Finalist | 18–6 | 2019 | 6 |
| 4 | Sherbrooke Vert et Or | RSEQ Champion | 15–1 | 1975 | 1 |
| 5 | Windsor Lancers | OUA Finalist | 15–5 | None | 0 |
| 6 | Montreal Carabins | RSEQ Finalist | 11–5 | 1970 | 1 |
| 7 | Saskatchewan Huskies | Canada West Bronze | 17–7 | 2004 | 4 |
| 8 | Toronto Varsity Blues | OUA Bronze | 13–7 | None | 0 |

== Championship bracket ==
First round: March 17
1 | Alberta Golden Bears | 3
8 | Toronto Varsity Blues | 1
4 | Sherbrooke Vert & Or | 3
5 | Windsor Lancers | 0
2 | McMaster Marauders | 3
7 | Saskatchewan Huskies | 0
3 | Trinity Western Spartans | 3
6 | Montreal Carabins | 0

Semi-finals: March 18
1 | Alberta Golden Bears | 0
4 | Sherbrooke Vert & Or | 3
2 | McMaster Marauders | 1
3 | Trinity Western Spartans | 3

Gold medal game: March 19
3 | Trinity Western Spartans | 3
4 | Sherbrooke Vert & Or | 0
Bronze medal game: March 19
1 | Alberta Golden Bears | 0
2 | McMaster Marauders | 3

=== Bronze medal match ===
| 19 March 2023; 3:00 p.m. EDT | (1) Alberta Golden Bears | 0–3 | (2) McMaster Marauders | Burridge Gymnasium, Hamilton, Ontario; Attendance: 1,812 |
| 19 March 2023; 3:00 p.m. EDT | (21–25, 23–25, 23–25); Boxscore | | | Burridge Gymnasium, Hamilton, Ontario; Attendance: 1,812 |

=== Gold medal match ===
| 19 March 2023; 6:00 p.m. EDT | (3) Trinity Western Spartans | 3–0 | (4) Sherbrooke Vert et Or | Burridge Gymnasium, Hamilton, Ontario; Attendance: 1,811 |
| 19 March 2023; 6:00 p.m. EDT | (25–16, 25–20, 25–15); Boxscore | | | Burridge Gymnasium, Hamilton, Ontario; Attendance: 1,811 |

== Consolation bracket ==
Semi-Finals: March 18
5 | Windsor Lancers | 1
8 | Toronto Varsity Blues | 3
6 | Montreal Carabins | 3
7 | Saskatchewan Huskies | 2

Fifth Place Game: March 19
6 | Montreal Carabins | 3
8 | Toronto Varsity Blues | 2

== Awards ==
=== Championship awards ===
- Championship MVP – Mathias Elser, Trinity Western
- R.W. Pugh Fair Play Award – Montreal Carabins

=== Mikasa Players of the Game ===
- Trinity Western: Mathias Elser
- Sherbrooke: Zachary Hollands

=== All-Star Team ===
- Sam Cooper, McMaster
- Jordan Canham, Alberta
- Jonathan Portelance, Sherbrooke
- Yoan David, Sherbrooke
- Brodie Hofer, Trinity Western
- Jesse Elser, Trinity Western
- Mathias Elser, Trinity Western
