= 2018 U Sports Men's Volleyball Championship =

Canadian university volleyball championship

- Season: 2017–18
- Teams: Eight
- Finals site: Burridge Gymnasium; Hamilton, Ontario
- Champions: UBC Thunderbirds (4th title)
- Runner-up: Trinity Western Spartans
- Winning coach: Kerry MacDonald (1st title)
- Championship MVP: Byron Keturakis (UBC Thunderbirds)

The 2018 U Sports Men's Volleyball Championship was held from March 16 to March 18, 2018, in Hamilton, Ontario, to determine a national champion for the 2017–18 U Sports men's volleyball season. The tournament was played at Burridge Gymnasium on the campus of McMaster University. It was the fifth time that McMaster had hosted the tournament and the second time in three years. This was the last tournament to feature an Atlantic University Sport champion as that conference withdrew from men's volleyball competition beginning with the 2018–19 season.

The third-seeded UBC Thunderbirds defeated the two-time defending champion Trinity Western Spartans as the Thunderbirds won the fourth national championship in program history and their first since 1983.

== Participating teams ==
Seed	Team	Qualified	Record	Last	Total
1	Trinity Western Spartans	Canada West Champion	22–2	2017	5
2	Alberta Golden Bears	Canada West Finalist	19–5	2015	8
3	UBC Thunderbirds	Canada West Bronze	20–4	1983	3
4	Montreal Carabins	RSEQ Champion	12–2	1970	1
5	McMaster Marauders	OUA Champion (Host)	15–2	None	0
6	UNB Varsity Reds	AUS Champion	4–11	None	0
7	Queen's Gaels	OUA Finalist	10–8	None	0
8	Windsor Lancers	OUA Bronze	10–7	None	0

== Championship bracket ==
First Round: March 16
1	Trinity Western Spartans	3
8	Windsor Lancers	1
4	Montreal Carabins	2
5	McMaster Marauders	3
2	Alberta Golden Bears	3
7	Queen's Gaels	1
3	UBC Thunderbirds	3
6	UNB Varsity Reds	0

Semi-Finals: March 17
1	Trinity Western Spartans	3
5	McMaster Marauders	1
2	Alberta Golden Bears	1
3	UBC Thunderbirds	3

Gold Medal Game: March 18
1	Trinity Western Spartans	0
3	UBC Thunderbirds	3
Bronze Medal Game: March 18
2	Alberta Golden Bears	0
5	McMaster Marauders	3

== Consolation bracket ==
Semi-Finals: March 17
4	Montreal Carabins	3
8	Windsor Lancers	0
6	UNB Varsity Reds	3
7	Queen's Gaels	0

Fifth Place Game: March 18
4	Montreal Carabins	3
6	UNB Varsity Reds	0

== Awards ==
=== Championship awards ===
- U Sports Championship MVP – Byron Keturakis, UBC
- R.W. Pugh Fair Play Award – Irvan Brar, UBC

=== All-Star Team ===
- Taryq Sani - Alberta
- Brandon Koppers - McMaster
- Pearson Eshenko - Trinity Western
- Eric Loeppky - Trinity Western
- Adam Schriemer - Trinity Western
- Byron Keturakis - UBC
- Irvan Brar - UBC
