= Adam Schriemer =

Canadian volleyball player (born 1995)

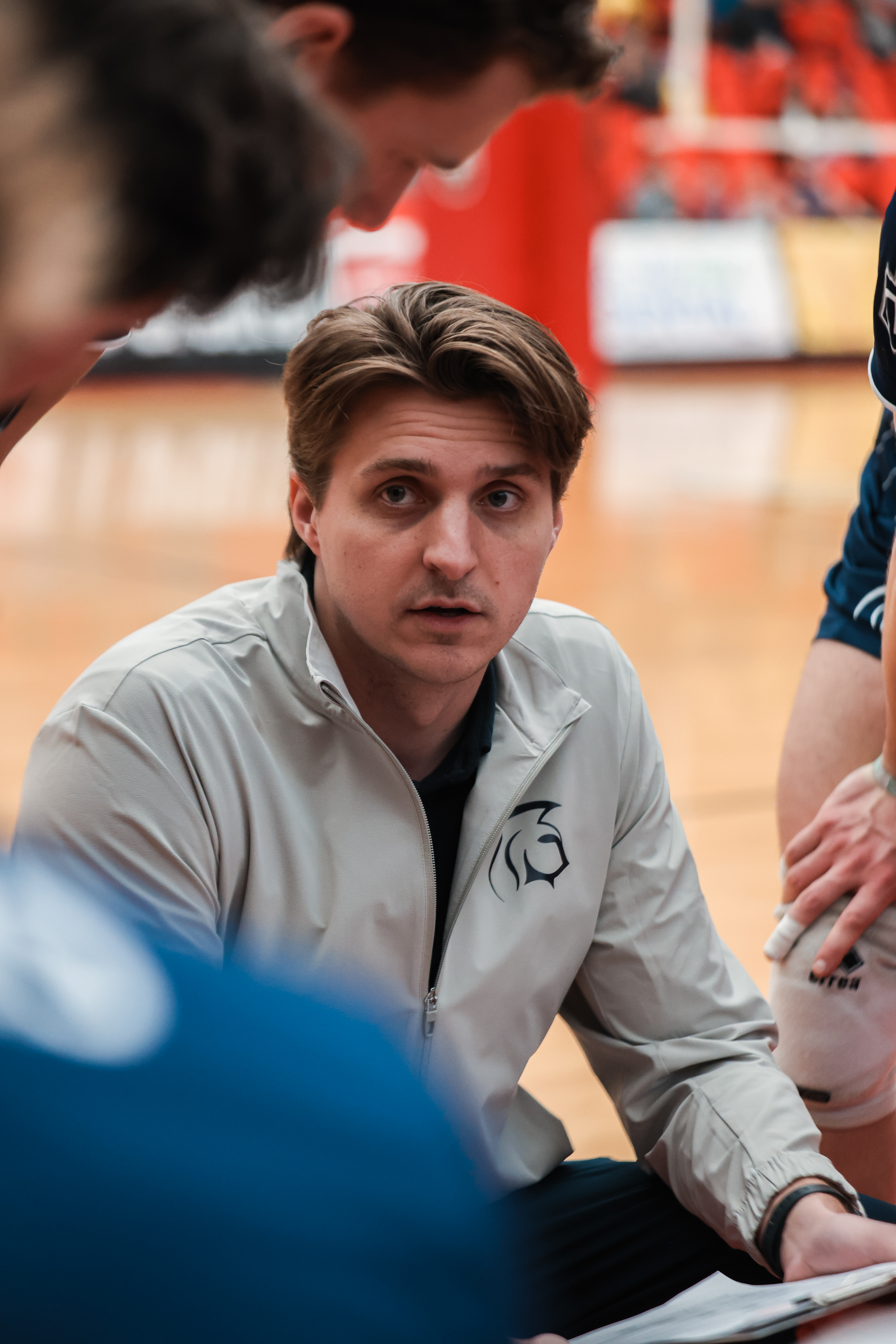
- Schriemer in 2019

Personal information
- Born: August 17, 1995 (age 31); Winnipeg, Manitoba, Canada
- Hometown: Winnipeg, Manitoba
- Height: 2.00 m (6 ft 7 in)
- Weight: 89 kg (196 lb)
- Spike: 350 cm (138 in)
- Block: 328 cm (129 in)
- Education: Trinity Western University

Coaching information
- Current team: Trinity Western Spartans
Previous teams coached
| Years | Teams |
|---|---|
| 2019–2022; 2022– | Trinity Western Spartans (AC); Trinity Western Spartans |

Volleyball information
- Position: Setter

Career
| Years | Teams |
|---|---|
| 2013–2018; 2018–2019 | Trinity Western Spartans; SVG Lüneburg |

National team
| 2014; 2019 | Canada U21; Canada |
Honours
Men's volleyball
Representing Canada
Junior NORCECA Championship
| Silver medal – second place | 2014 El Salvador |
- Last updated: 2024-08-11

Adam Schriemer (born August 17, 1995) is a Canadian male volleyball coach and former player. He was a member of the Canada men's national volleyball team in 2019. He is currently the head coach of Trinity Western Spartans men's volleyball team.

== Playing career ==
=== Club ===
Adam played post-secondary volleyball at Trinity Western University. During his time there he led the Spartans to four straight national U Sports championships between 2014 and 2018, winning in 2016 and 2017. Following his post-secondary career, he signed with German club SVG Lüneburg, playing with them for one season.

=== National team ===
Adam joined the senior Canadian national team in 2019, playing in the Nations League.

== Coaching career ==
Following his playing career, Schriemer joined the Trinity Western Spartans as an assistant coach in 2019. In 2022, he was named interim co-head coach of the Spartans, and in 2023 he became the head coach of the Spartans.

== Sporting achievements ==
=== Player ===
  - 2014–15 CIS Championship, with Trinity Western Spartans
  - 2015–16 CIS Championship, with Trinity Western Spartans
  - 2016–17 U Sports Championship, with Trinity Western Spartans
  - 2017–18 U Sports Championship, with Trinity Western Spartans

=== Coach ===
  - 2022–23 U Sports Championship, with Trinity Western Spartans
  - 2025–26 U Sports Championship, with Trinity Western Spartans
  - 2026 NORCECA U19 Continental Volleyball Championship
