= Emma Nuttall =

British track and field athlete (born 1992)

Personal information
- Born: 23 April 1992 (age 33) Edinburgh, Scotland

Sport
- Country: Great Britain
- Event: High Jump
- Coached by: Fuzz Caan

Emma Maud Nuttall (born 23 April 1992) is a British track and field athlete who specialises in the high jump. She represented Scotland at the 2014 Commonwealth Games and won the British title in 2013. She held the Scottish Indoor record with a clearance of 1.88 metres in 2014 which was only beaten in 2018 (1.90)

== Career ==
Born in Edinburgh, Scotland, Nuttall became a member of Edinburgh A.C and was coached by 1976 Olympian Moira Maguire until 2010. She won the Scottish Schools Championship in 2010 with a clearance of 1.78 metres. A year later she jumped 1.82m when winning the British U20 Championship (incorporating the European trials), to earn selection for the 2011 European Junior Championships in Tallinn, Estonia, where she finished 15th overall in qualifying with 1.77m.

Nuttall improved her best to 1.86 metres in June 2012, before finishing fourth a week later at the British Olympic Trials with 1.81m. In 2013, she won the British Championships in Birmingham, further improving her best to 1.87m.

On 8 March 2014 in Edmonton, Alberta, Canada, she broke the long-standing CIS (Canadian Interuniversity Sport) Indoor Championship record, jumping a height of 1.88m. In doing so, she also bettered the Scottish Indoor Record by 1 cm. She went on to earn selection for Team Scotland to compete in the Glasgow 2014 Commonwealth Games, where she finished 14th in qualification with 1.81m.

In 2014, she suffered a torn patella tendon and In 2015 underwent a PRP procedure to repair the tear. The following two years were spent performing light training and rehab with little or no competitive jumping.

Nuttall was formerly coached by Laurier Primeau while based in Canada, attending Trinity Western University, representing Trinity Western Spartans. She returned to the UK in June 2016 after graduating with a History major degree and moved to Loughborough to continue her High jumping with Fuzz Caan and his group.

In 2017, she qualified for the 2018 Gold Coast Commonwealth Games but suffered another knee injury in January 2018 which caused her to withdraw from the squad.

== Major championships ==
Year	Competition	Venue	Position	Notes
Representing Great Britain
2011	European Junior Championships	Tallinn, Estonia	15th (q)	1.77 m
Representing Scotland
2014	Commonwealth Games	Glasgow, Scotland	14th (q)	1.81 m
(q) Indicates overall position in qualifying round
