= Ben Josephson =

Canadian volleyball coach

Personal information
- Full name: Benjamin Josephson
- Hometown: Strathmore, Alberta, Canada
- Height: 1.93 m (6 ft 4 in)
- Education: Trinity Western University

Coaching information
- Current team: University of Texas Longhorns (AHC)
Previous teams coached
| Years | Teams |
|---|---|
| 2004–2007; 2007–2022; 2019–2020; 2022; 2023– | Trinity Western Spartans (AC); Trinity Western Spartans; Canada (W) (AC); Canada (M); Kentucky Wildcats (AHC) |

Volleyball information
- Position: Setter

Career
| Years | Teams |
|---|---|
| 1999–2003 | Trinity Western Spartans |

Ben Josephson is a Canadian professional volleyball coach who coached the Canada men's national volleyball team in 2022. He is currently an associate head coach of the University of Texas Longhorns women's volleyball team.

== Player ==
Josephson played for the Trinity Western Spartans from 1999 to 2003 while attending Trinity Western University.

== Coaching ==
Josephson started his coaching career as an assistant coach for the Trinity Western Spartans in 2004 before becoming in 2007. During his time at Trinity Western University, he guided the Spartans through a period of great success, qualifying for the national championship 11 times and winning it 5 times. Josephson was also named U Sports "Coach of the Year" three times during this period. While coaching the Spartans, Josephson was also an assistant coach for the Canada women's national volleyball team from 2019 to 2020.

In November 2021, Josephson was named head coach of the Canada men's national volleyball team. He coached the team for 2022 Nations League and the 2022 FIVB World Championship. Following a 17th-place finish at the World Championship, Josephson was let go from the coaching position in October 2022.

Since 2023, Josephson has been the associate head coach of the Kentucky Wildcats women's volleyball team.

== Honours ==
=== Club ===
- 2009–10 CIS Championship, with Trinity Western Spartans
- 2010–11 CIS Championship, with Trinity Western Spartans
- 2011–12 CIS Championship, with Trinity Western Spartans
- 2014–15 CIS Championship, with Trinity Western Spartans
- 2015–16 CIS Championship, with Trinity Western Spartans
- 2016–17 U Sports Championship, with Trinity Western Spartans
- 2017–18 U Sports Championship, with Trinity Western Spartans
- 2018–19 U Sports Championship, with Trinity Western Spartans
- 2021–22 U Sports Championship, with Trinity Western Spartans

=== Individual awards ===
- 2011–12: CIS Coach of the Year
- 2013–14: CIS Coach of the Year
- 2019–20: U Sports Coach of the Year

Sporting positions
| Preceded by (Canada) Glenn Hoag | Head coach of Canada; 2021–2022 | Succeeded by (Finland) Tuomas Sammelvuo |
