= 2016 CIS Men's Volleyball Championship =

Canadian university volleyball championship

- Season: 2015–16
- Teams: Eight
- Finals site: Burridge Gymnasium; Hamilton, Ontario
- Champions: Trinity Western Spartans (4th title)
- Runner-up: McMaster Marauders
- Winning coach: Ben Josephson (3rd title)
- Championship MVP: Blake Scheerhoorn (Trinity Western Spartans)

The 2016 CIS Men's Volleyball Championship was held from March 10 to March 12, 2016, in Hamilton, Ontario, to determine a national champion for the 2015–16 U Sports men's volleyball season. The 50th edition of the tournament was played at Burridge Gymnasium on the campus of McMaster University. It was the fourth time that McMaster had hosted the tournament and the first since 2007.

The Canada West champion Trinity Western Spartans defeated the top-seeded host OUA champion McMaster Marauders 3–1 to win the fourth title in program history. The Spartans had a 9–9 record in January, but finished the season with a 12–2 record, including playoffs.

== Participating teams ==
Seed	Team	Qualified	Record	Last	Total
1	McMaster Marauders	OUA Champion (Host)	18–2	None	0
2	Trinity Western Spartans	Canada West Champion	14–10	2012	3
3	Laval Rouge et Or	RSEQ Champion	14–3	2013	4
4	UNB Varsity Reds	AUS Champion	9–8	None	0
5	Saskatchewan Huskies	Canada West Finalist	21–3	2004	4
6	Alberta Golden Bears	Canada West Bronze	16–8	2015	8
7	Ryerson Rams	OUA Finalist	14–6	None	0
8	Waterloo Warriors	OUA Bronze	11–9	None	0

== Championship bracket ==
First Round: March 10
1	McMaster Marauders	3
8	Waterloo Warriors	0
4	UNB Varsity Reds	2
5	Saskatchewan Huskies	3
2	Trinity Western Spartans	3
7	Ryerson Rams	1
3	Laval Rouge et Or	0
6	Alberta Golden Bears	3

Semi-Finals: March 11
1	McMaster Marauders	3
5	Saskatchewan Huskies	0
2	Trinity Western Spartans	3
6	Alberta Golden Bears	2

Gold Medal Game: March 12
1	McMaster Marauders	1
2	Trinity Western Spartans	3
Bronze Medal Game: March 12
5	Saskatchewan Huskies	0
6	Alberta Golden Bears	3

== Consolation bracket ==
Semi-Finals: March 11
4	UNB Varsity Reds	3
8	Waterloo Warriors	2
3	Laval Rouge et Or	3
7	Ryerson Rams	0

Fifth Place Game: March 12
3	Laval Rouge et Or	3
4	UNB Varsity Reds	0

== Awards ==
=== Championship awards ===
- U Sports Championship MVP – Blake Scheerhoorn, Trinity Western
- R.W. Pugh Fair Play Award – Brett Walsh, Alberta

=== All-Star Team ===
- Ryley Barnes, Alberta
- Jordan Nowakowski, Saskatchewan
- Ryan Sclater, Trinity Western
- Danny Demyanenko, McMaster
- Brett Walsh, Alberta
- Stephen Marr, McMaster
- Black Scheerhoorn, Trinity Western
