= 2019 U Sports Men's Volleyball Championship =

Canadian university volleyball championship

- Season: 2018–19
- Teams: Eight
- Finals site: PEPS; Quebec City, Quebec
- Champions: Trinity Western Spartans (6th title)
- Runner-up: Brandon Bobcats
- Winning coach: Ben Josephson (5th title)
- Championship MVP: Eric Loeppky (Trinity Western Spartans)

The 2019 U Sports Men's Volleyball Championship was held from March 15 to March 17, 2019, in Quebec City, Quebec, to determine a national champion for the 2018–19 U Sports men's volleyball season. The tournament was played at PEPS at Université Laval. It was the 12th time that Laval had hosted the tournament, which is the most out of any program. This was also the first tournament to no longer feature an Atlantic University Sport champion as that conference had withdrawn from men's volleyball competition in 2018.

The second-seeded Trinity Western Spartans defeated the top-seeded Brandon Bobcats in a re-match of the Canada West Championship game as the Spartans won the sixth national championship in program history.

== Participating teams ==
Seed	Team	Qualified	Record	Last	Total
1	Brandon Bobcats	Canada West Champion	20–2	None	0
2	Trinity Western Spartans	Canada West Finalist	18–4	2017	5
3	Laval Rouge et Or	RSEQ Champion (Host)	16–0	2013	4
4	Mount Royal Cougars	Canada West Semifinalist (At-large berth)	15–7	None	0
5	Alberta Golden Bears	Canada West Quarterfinalist (At-large berth)	17–5	2015	8
6	Queen's Gaels	OUA Champion	15–3	None	0
7	McMaster Marauders	OUA Finalist	15–2	None	0
8	Montreal Carabins	RSEQ Finalist	12–4	1970	1

== Championship bracket ==
First Round: March 15
1	Brandon Bobcats	3
8	Montreal Carabins	0
4	Mount Royal Cougars	0
5	Alberta Golden Bears	3
2	Trinity Western Spartans	3
7	McMaster Marauders	1
3	Laval Rouge et Or	3
6	Queen's Gaels	2

Semi-Finals: March 16
1	Brandon Bobcats	3
5	Alberta Golden Bears	2
2	Trinity Western Spartans	3
3	Laval Rouge et Or	2

Gold Medal Game: March 17
1	Brandon Bobcats	0
2	Trinity Western Spartans	3
Bronze Medal Game: March 17
3	Laval Rouge et Or	3
5	Alberta Golden Bears	1

== Consolation bracket ==
Semi-Finals: March 16
4	Mount Royal Cougars	3
8	Montreal Carabins	2
6	Queen's Gaels	3
7	McMaster Marauders	0

Fifth Place Game: March 17
4	Mount Royal Cougars	0
6	Queen's Gaels	3

== Awards ==
=== Championship awards ===
- U Sports Championship MVP – Eric Loeppky, Trinity Western
- R.W. Pugh Fair Play Award – Vicente Ignacio Parraguirre Villalobos, Laval

=== All-Star Team ===
- Alexandre Obomsawin, Laval
- Vicente Ignacio Parraguirre Vallalobos, Laval
- Seth Friesen, Brandon
- Robin Baghdady, Brandon
- Jackson Howe, Trinity Western
- George Hobern, Alberta
- Eric Loeppky, Trinity Western
