= 2015 CIS Men's Volleyball Championship =

Canadian university volleyball championship

- Season: 2014–15
- Teams: Eight
- Finals site: Physical Activity Complex; Saskatoon, Saskatchewan
- Champions: Alberta Golden Bears (8th title)
- Runner-up: Trinity Western Spartans
- Winning coach: Terry Danyluk (7th title)
- Championship MVP: Brett Walsh (Alberta Golden Bears)

The 2015 CIS Men's Volleyball Championship was held from February 26 to February 28, 2015, in Saskatoon, Saskatchewan, to determine a national champion for the 2014–15 CIS men's volleyball season. The tournament was played at the Physical Activity Complex on the campus of the University of Saskatchewan. It was the second time that Saskatchewan had hosted the tournament and the first since 1980.

The Canada West champion Alberta Golden Bears defeated the Trinity Western Spartans in straight sets to repeat as national champions and win the eighth title in program history.

== Participating teams ==
Seed	Team	Qualified	Record	Last	Total
1	McMaster Marauders	OUA Champion	19–1	None	0
2	Dalhousie Tigers	AUS Champion	16–1	None	0
3	Alberta Golden Bears	Canada West Champion	21–3	2014	7
4	Laval Rouge et Or	RSEQ Champion	12–5	2013	4
5	Trinity Western Spartans	Canada West Finalist	20–4	2012	3
6	Waterloo Warriors	OUA Finalist	13–7	None	0
7	York Lions	OUA Bronze	13–7	None	0
8	Saskatchewan Huskies	Missed playoffs (Host)	12–12	2004	4

== Championship bracket ==
First Round: February 26
1	McMaster Marauders	3
8	Saskatchewan Huskies	0
4	Laval Rouge et Or	0
5	Trinity Western Spartans	3
2	Dalhousie Tigers	3
7	York Lions	2
3	Alberta Golden Bears	3
6	Waterloo Warriors	0

Semi-Finals: February 27
1	McMaster Marauders	1
5	Trinity Western Spartans	3
2	Dalhousie Tigers	0
3	Alberta Golden Bears	3

Gold Medal Game: February 28
3	Alberta Golden Bears	3
5	Trinity Western Spartans	0
Bronze Medal Game: February 28
1	McMaster Marauders	3
2	Dalhousie Tigers	0

== Consolation bracket ==
Semi-Finals: February 27
4	Laval Rouge et Or	1
8	Saskatchewan Huskies	3
6	Waterloo Warriors	2
7	York Lions	3

Fifth Place Game: February 28
7	York Lions	1
8	Saskatchewan Huskies	3

== Awards ==
=== Championship awards ===
- U Sports Championship MVP – Brett Walsh, Alberta
- R.W. Pugh Fair Play Award – Dan Ota, Dalhousie

=== All-Star Team ===
- Taylor Arnett Alberta
- Bryan Duquette Dalhousie
- Matthew Busse Saskatchewan
- Danny Demyanenko, McMaster
- Brett Walsh, Alberta
- Nicholas Del bianco, Trinity Western
- Ryley Barnes, Alberta
