= Adel Sennoun =

Algerian volleyball player (born 1967)

Personal information
- Nationality: Algerian
- Born: 1 September 1967 (age 57)

Sport
- Sport: Volleyball

Adel Sennoun (born 1 September 1967) is an Algerian volleyball player. He competed in the men's tournament at the 1992 Summer Olympics.
