= 2017 U Sports Men's Volleyball Championship =

Canadian university volleyball championship

- Season: 2016–17
- Teams: Eight
- Finals site: Saville Community Sports Centre; Edmonton, Alberta
- Champions: Trinity Western Spartans (5th title)
- Runner-up: Alberta Golden Bears
- Winning coach: Ben Josephson (4th title)
- Championship MVP: Adam Schriemer (Trinity Western Spartans)

The 2017 U Sports Men's Volleyball Championship was held from March 17 to March 19, 2017, in Edmonton, Alberta, to determine a national champion for the 2016–17 U Sports men's volleyball season. The tournament was played at the Saville Community Sports Centre at the University of Alberta. It was the sixth time that Alberta had hosted the tournament and the first time since 2009.

The Canada West champion Trinity Western Spartans repeated as national champions as they defeated the host Alberta Golden Bears.

== Participating teams ==
Seed	Team	Qualified	Record	Last	Total
1	Trinity Western Spartans	Canada West Champion	21–3	2016	4
2	Manitoba Bisons	Canada West Finalist	21–3	2003	10
3	UBC Thunderbirds	Canada West Bronze	16–8	1983	3
4	Laval Rouge et Or	RSEQ Champion	15–2	2013	4
5	McMaster Marauders	OUA Champion	17–0	None	0
6	UNB Varsity Reds	AUS Champion	9–8	None	0
7	Alberta Golden Bears	Canada West Semifinalist (Host)	20–4	2015	8
8	Waterloo Warriors	OUA Finalist	9–8	None	0

== Championship bracket ==
First Round: March 17
1	Trinity Western Spartans	3
8	Waterloo Warriors	0
4	Laval Rouge et Or	2
5	McMaster Marauders	3
2	Manitoba Bisons	1
7	Alberta Golden Bears	3
3	UBC Thunderbids	3
6	UNB Varsity Reds	1

Semi-Finals: March 18
1	Trinity Western Spartans	3
5	McMaster Marauders	2
3	UBC Thunderbids	2
7	Alberta Golden Bears	3

Gold Medal Game: March 19
1	Trinity Western Spartans	3
7	Alberta Golden Bears	1
Bronze Medal Game: March 19
3	UBC Thunderbirds	0
5	McMaster Marauders	3

== Consolation bracket ==
Semi-Finals: March 18
4	Laval Rouge et Or	3
8	Waterloo Warriors	0
2	Manitoba Bisons	3
6	UNB Varsity Reds	0

Fifth Place Game: March 19
2	Manitoba Bisons	3
4	Laval Rouge et Or	1

== Awards ==
=== Championship awards ===
- U Sports Championship MVP – Adam Schriemer, Trinity Western
- R.W. Pugh Fair Play Award – Jayson McCarthy, McMaster

=== All-Star Team ===
- Ryan Sclater, Trinity Western
- Adam Schriemer, Trinity Western
- Blake Scheerhoorn, Trinity Western
- Ryan Nickifor, Alberta
- Taylor Arnett, Alberta
- Brett Walsh, Alberta
- Brandon Koppers, McMaster
