= Ryan Sclater =

Canadian volleyball player (born 1994)

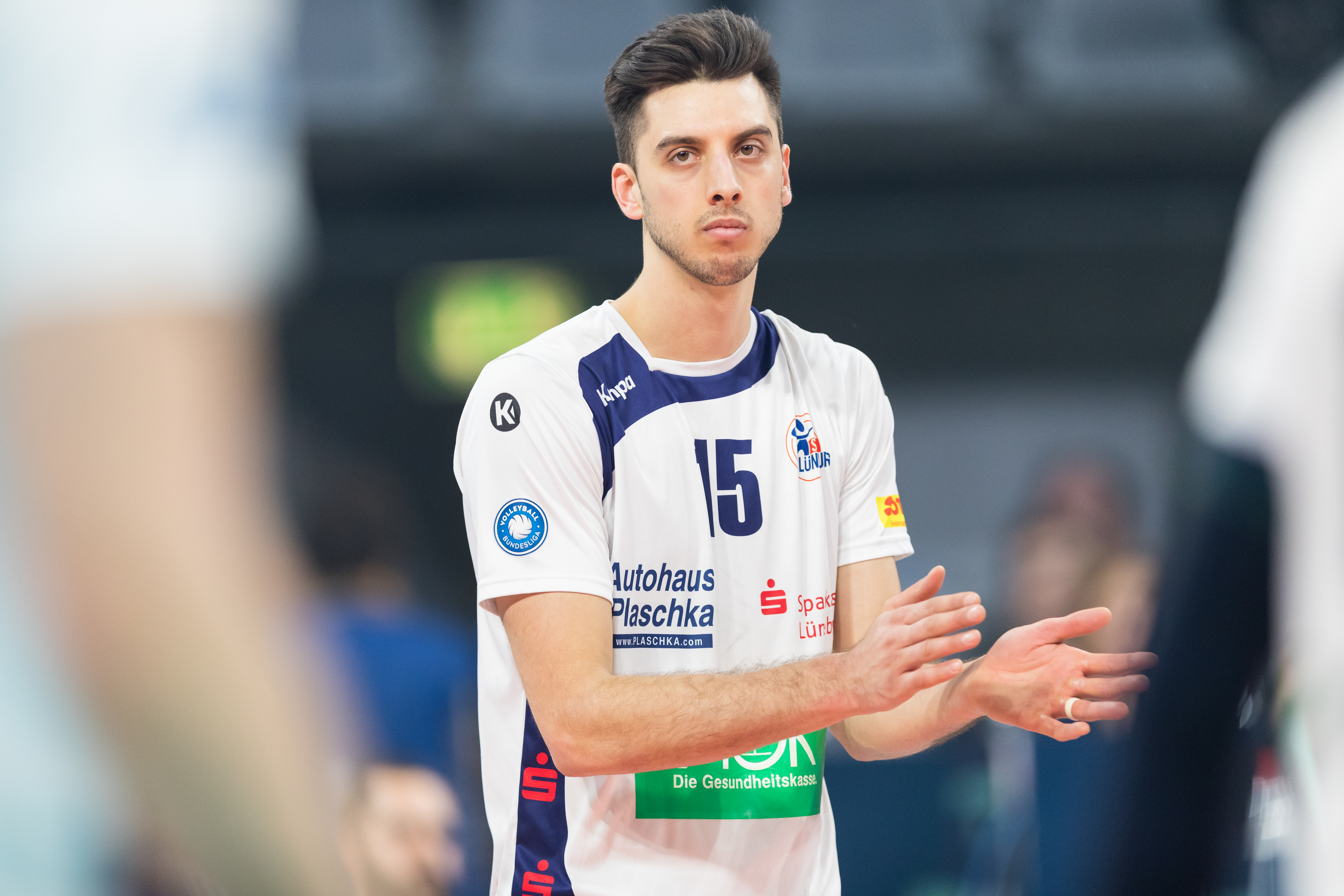
- Sclater in 2019

Personal information
- Full name: Ryan Joseph Sclater
- Born: 10 February 1994 (age 32); New Westminster, British Columbia, Canada
- Hometown: Port Coquitlam, British Columbia, Canada
- Height: 2.01 m (6 ft 7 in)
- Weight: 92 kg (203 lb)
- Spike: 347 cm (137 in)
- Block: 320 cm (126 in)
- Education: Trinity Western University

Volleyball information
- Position: Opposite

Career
Years	Teams
2012–2017; 2017–2019; 2019–2021; 2021–2022; 2022–2023; 2023–2024; 2024–	Trinity Western Spartans; SVG Lüneburg; Montpellier Volley; Arago de Sète; Al Jazira; Jastrzębski Węgiel; Tours VB

National team
2018–	Canada

Ryan Joseph Sclater (born 10 February 1994) is a Canadian professional volleyball player who plays as an opposite spiker for the Canada national team.

== Career ==
=== Club ===
Sclater played U Sports men's volleyball at Trinity Western University for the Spartans. During his time there, he led the Spartans to back-to-back national championships in 2016 and 2017, winning U Sports Men's Volleyball Player of the Year for the 2016-17 season. Following his post-secondary career, Sclater signed with German club SVG Lüneburg. He played there for two seasons, helping the club reach the German Cup final in 2019. In May 2019, Sclater signed for the French club Montpellier Volley

=== National team ===
Sclater joined the senior Canadian national team in 2018, playing in both Nations League, and the World Championships. In June 2021, he was named to Canada's 2020 Olympic team.

== Honours ==
=== University ===
- 2015 CIS Men's Volleyball Championship, with Trinity Western Spartans
- 2016 U Sports Men's Volleyball Championship, with Trinity Western Spartans
- 2017 U Sports Men's Volleyball Championship, with Trinity Western Spartans
