= Lucas Van Berkel =

Canadian volleyball player (born 1991)

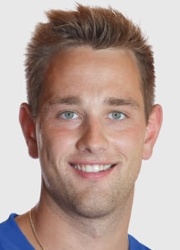
- Lucas Van Berkel in 2017

Personal information
- Full name: Lucas Joshua Van Berkel
- Born: 29 November 1991 (age 34); Edmonton, Alberta, Canada
- Hometown: Edmonton, Alberta
- Height: 207 cm (6 ft 9 in)
- Weight: 109 kg (240 lb)
- Spike: 350 cm (138 in)
- Block: 326 cm (128 in)
- Education: Trinity Western University

Volleyball information
- Position: Middle Blocker

Career
Years	Teams
2009–2014; 2014–2015; 2015–2016; 2016–2017; 2017–2018; 2018–2019; 2019–2020; 2020–2021; 2021–2022; 2022–2023; 2023–2024	Trinity Western University; Linköpings VC; VK Pribram; Volley Amriswil; Monini Spoleto; United Volleys Frankfurt; Galatasaray S.K. SWD Powervolleys Düren; VfB Friedrichshafen; Tourcoing Lille Métropole; Sporting CP

National team
2015–2024	Canada
Honours
Representing Canada
Men's Volleyball
FIVB World League
Bronze medal – third place	2017 Curitiba	Team
- Last updated: 28 October 2024

Lucas Joshua Van Berkel (born 29 November 1991) is a Canadian male volleyball player from Edmonton, Alberta. He is part of the Canada men's national volleyball team. On club level, he plays for United Volleys Rhein-Main. In June 2021, Van Berkel was named to Canada's 2020 Olympic team.
