= Daniel Jansen Van Doorn =

Canadian volleyball player (born 1990)

Personal information
- Full name: Daniel Cornelius Jansen Van Doorn
- Nickname: JVD
- Nationality: Canadian
- Born: 21 March 1990 (age 36); Langley, British Columbia
- Hometown: Langley, British Columbia
- Height: 207 cm (6 ft 9 in)
- Weight: 98 kg (216 lb)
- Spike: 351 cm (138 in)
- Block: 321 cm (126 in)
- Education: Trinity Western University

Volleyball information
- Position: Middle blocker

Career
Years	Teams
2009–2013; 2013–2015; 2015–2016; 2016–2018; 2018–2019; 2019-2020	Trinity Western Spartans; Tourcoing Lille Metropole; Pamvohaikos; Tours VB; Vammalan Lentopallo; Knack Roeselare

National team
2014–2021	Canada
Honours
Men's Volleyball
Representing Canada
FIVB World League
Bronze medal – third place	2017 Curitiba
NORCECA Championship
Gold medal – first place	2015 Mexico
- Last updated: 10 August 2016

Daniel Cornelius Jansen Van Doorn (born 21 March 1990) is a former Canadian male volleyball player. He was a member of the Canada men's national volleyball team, a gold medallist at the 2015 Men's NORCECA Volleyball Championship, and a competitor at the 2016 Summer Olympics.

== Personal life ==
Daniel Jansen Van Doorn was born in Langley, British Columbia to parents Marvin and Carolyn. He has four siblings, two of whom have also played volleyball at a high level. Daniel started playing volleyball at the age of 14, and grew up idolizing former national team member Sébastien Ruette, who became his inspiration to pursue a career in volleyball.

== Career ==
=== Club ===
Daniel was a member of the Trinity Western Spartans from 2009 to 2013. During his time there, he helped the team win back to back CIS Volleyball Championships in 2011 and 2012, as well as a second-place finish in the 2010 tournament. After graduating in 2013, he signed with French team Tourcoing Lille Metropole. He helped the team rise from a 12th place standing at the halfway mark in the season to finish first in the Pro B Championship, and earn promotion to the Pro A Championship. After two years with the team, he left and joined Greek side Pamvohaikos, before moving back to France to play for Tours VB. In 2017, he helped the team win the CEV Cup against Trentino.

=== National team ===
Daniel joined the senior national team in 2014. He has helped the team win gold at the 2015 Men's NORCECA Volleyball Championship, and was a member of the squad that finished 5th at the 2016 Summer Olympics. During the 2017 World League Finals, he also helped the team win bronze.

== Sporting achievements ==
=== Club ===
- 2010 CIS Men's Volleyball Championship, with Trinity Western Spartans
- 2011 CIS Men's Volleyball Championship, with Trinity Western Spartans
- 2012 CIS Men's Volleyball Championship, with Trinity Western Spartans
- 2013/2014 Pro B Championship, with Tourcoing Lille Metropole

=== National team ===
- 2015 NORCECA Championship
- 2017 FIVB World League

=== Individual ===
- 2015 NORCECA Championship - Best Middle Blocker
