= Joshua Howatson =

Canadian volleyball player (born 1984)

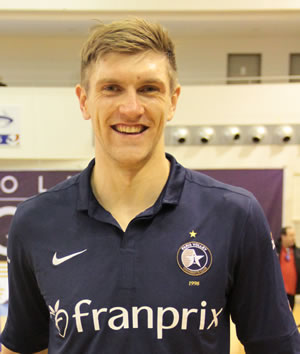

Personal information
- Nationality: Canadian
- Born: 7 October 1984 (age 42)
- Height: 1.99 m (6 ft 6 in)
- Weight: 95 kg (209 lb)
- Spike: 346 cm (136 in)
- Block: 325 cm (128 in)

Volleyball information
- Number: 4

Career
Years	Teams
2010	Team Canada

National team
2010	Canada

Joshua "Josh" Howatson (born 7 October 1984) is a Canadian male volleyball player. He was part of the Canada men's national volleyball team at the 2010 FIVB Volleyball Men's World Championship in Italy. He played for Team Canada.

== Clubs ==
- Team Canada (2010)
