= 2021 Men's NORCECA Volleyball Championship =

27th edition, held in Durango City, Mexico

2021 Men's NORCECA Championship

Tournament details
- Host country: Mexico
- City: Durango City
- Dates: 18 – 23 August
- Teams: 8 (from 1 confederation)
- Venue: 1 (in 1 host city)

Final positions
- Champions: Puerto Rico (1st title)
- Runners-up: Canada
- Third place: Mexico
- Fourth place: Cuba

Tournament awards
- MVP: (Puerto Rico) Arturo Iglesias
- Best Setter: (Mexico) Pedro Rangel
- Best OH: (Cuba) Miguel Ángel López (Canada) Brandon Koppers
- Best MB: (Cuba) José Israel Masso (Dominican Republic) Dawilin Méndez
- Best OPP: (Dominican Republic) Henry Tapia
- Best Libero: (Puerto Rico) Dennis Del Valle

Tournament statistics
- Best scorer: (Dominican Republic) Henry Tapia (97 points)

The 2021 Men's NORCECA Volleyball Championship was the 27th edition of the tournament, and was held in Durango City, Mexico from 18 to 23 August 2021. The first and second places qualified to the 2022 FIVB Volleyball Men's World Championship.

== Venue ==
- Auditorio del Pueblo, Durango City, Mexico

== Pool standing procedure ==
1. Number of matches won
2. Match points
3. Points ratio
4. Sets ratio
5. Result of the last match between the tied teams

Match won 3–0: 5 match points for the winner, 0 match points for the loser
Match won 3–1: 4 match points for the winner, 1 match point for the loser
Match won 3–2: 3 match points for the winner, 2 match points for the loser

== Preliminary round ==
- All times are Central Daylight Time (UTC−05:00).

=== Pool A ===
Pos	Team	Pld	W	L	Pts	SPW	SPL	SPR	SW	SL	SR	Qualification
1	Mexico	3	3	0	14	248	185	1.341	9	1	9.000	Semifinals
2	Puerto Rico	3	2	1	11	235	207	1.135	7	3	2.333	Quarterfinals
3	Canada	3	1	2	5	214	197	1.086	3	6	0.500	Quarterfinals
4	Trinidad and Tobago	3	0	3	0	137	225	0.609	0	9	0.000	5th–8th semifinals

Date	Time		Score		Set 1	Set 2	Set 3	Set 4	Set 5	Total	Report
18 Aug	15:00	Canada	0–3	Puerto Rico	22–25	20–25	19–25			61–75	P2 P3
18 Aug	20:00	Mexico	3–0	Trinidad and Tobago	25–11	25–13	25–8			75–32	P2 P3
19 Aug	13:00	Canada	3–0	Trinidad and Tobago	25–22	25–18	25–14			75–54	P2 P3
19 Aug	20:00	Mexico	3–1	Puerto Rico	20–25	25–22	25–20	25–18		95–85	P2 P3
20 Aug	13:00	Puerto Rico	3–0	Trinidad and Tobago	25–17	25–16	25–18			75–51	P2 P3
20 Aug	20:00	Mexico	3–0	Canada	25–21	28–26	25–21			78–68	P2 P3

=== Pool B ===
Pos	Team	Pld	W	L	Pts	SPW	SPL	SPR	SW	SL	SR	Qualification
1	Cuba	3	3	0	14	254	217	1.171	9	1	9.000	Semifinals
2	United States	3	2	1	7	277	264	1.049	6	6	1.000	Quarterfinals
3	Dominican Republic	3	1	2	6	277	288	0.962	5	7	0.714	Quarterfinals
4	Guatemala	3	0	3	3	252	291	0.866	3	9	0.333	5th–8th semifinals

Date	Time		Score		Set 1	Set 2	Set 3	Set 4	Set 5	Total	Report
18 Aug	13:00	United States	3–2	Guatemala	24–26	25–23	23–25	25–20	15–10	112–104	P2 P3
18 Aug	18:00	Cuba	3–1	Dominican Republic	25–17	29–31	25–21	25–19		104–88	P2 P3
19 Aug	15:00	Cuba	3–0	Guatemala	25–22	25–22	25–19			75–63	P2 P3
19 Aug	18:00	United States	3–1	Dominican Republic	25–18	23–25	25–18	26–24		99–85	P2 P3
20 Aug	15:00	Dominican Republic	3–1	Guatemala	29–31	25–16	25–19	25–19		104–85	P2 P3
20 Aug	18:00	United States	0–3	Cuba	23–25	23–25	20–25			66–75	P2 P3

== Final round ==
- All times are Central Daylight Time (UTC−05:00).

Quarterfinals
21 August
Puerto Rico	3
Dominican Republic	1
21 August
United States	2
Canada	3

Semifinals
22 August
Cuba	1
Puerto Rico	3
22 August
Mexico	0
Canada	3

Final
23 August
Puerto Rico	3
Canada	0
3rd place match
23 August
Cuba	1
Mexico	3

5th–8th semifinals
22 August
Trinidad and Tobago	0
Dominican Republic	3
22 August
Guatemala	1
United States	3

5th place match
23 August
Dominican Republic	1
United States	3
7th place match
23 August
Trinidad and Tobago	0
Guatemala	3

=== Quarterfinals ===
Date	Time		Score		Set 1	Set 2	Set 3	Set 4	Set 5	Total	Report
21 Aug	18:00	United States	2–3	Canada	25–22	22–25	15–25	25–22	10–15	97–109	P2 P3
21 Aug	20:00	Puerto Rico	3–1	Dominican Republic	25–22	22–25	25–16	25–23		97–86	P2 P3

=== 5th–8th semifinals ===
Date	Time		Score		Set 1	Set 2	Set 3	Set 4	Set 5	Total	Report
22 Aug	13:00	Trinidad and Tobago	0–3	Dominican Republic	19–25	20–25	22–25			61–75	P2 P3
22 Aug	15:00	Guatemala	1–3	United States	25–23	22–25	19–25	31–33		97–106	P2 P3

=== Semifinals ===
Date	Time		Score		Set 1	Set 2	Set 3	Set 4	Set 5	Total	Report
22 Aug	18:00	Cuba	1–3	Puerto Rico	16–25	25–19	24–26	29–31		94–101	P2 P3
22 Aug	20:00	Mexico	0–3	Canada	22–25	17–25	18–25			57–75	P2 P3

=== 7th place match ===
Date	Time		Score		Set 1	Set 2	Set 3	Set 4	Set 5	Total	Report
23 Aug	13:00	Trinidad and Tobago	0–3	Guatemala	22–25	22–25	21–25			65–75	P2 P3

=== 5th place match ===
Date	Time		Score		Set 1	Set 2	Set 3	Set 4	Set 5	Total	Report
23 Aug	15:00	Dominican Republic	1–3	United States	25–21	22–25	22–25	21–25		90–96	P2 P3

=== 3rd place match ===
Date	Time		Score		Set 1	Set 2	Set 3	Set 4	Set 5	Total	Report
23 Aug	18:00	Cuba	1–3	Mexico	25–22	18–25	28–30	25–27		96–104	P2 P3

=== Final ===
Date	Time		Score		Set 1	Set 2	Set 3	Set 4	Set 5	Total	Report
23 Aug	20:00	Puerto Rico	3–0	Canada	25–18	25–21	25–23			75–62	P2 P3

== Final standing ==
Rank	Team
1st place, gold medalist(s)	Puerto Rico
2nd place, silver medalist(s)	Canada
3rd place, bronze medalist(s)	Mexico
4	Cuba
5	United States
6	Dominican Republic
7	Guatemala
8	Trinidad and Tobago

Qualified for the 2022 World Championship

2021 Men's NORCECA champions

Puerto Rico
1st title

== Awards ==
- Most valuable player
  (Puerto Rico) Arturo Iglesias
- Best scorer
  (Dominican Republic) Henry Tapia
- Best server
  (Mexico) Josué De Jesús López
- Best digger
  (Puerto Rico) Dennis Del Valle
- Best receiver
  (Guatemala) Carlos López
- Best setter
  (Mexico) Pedro Rangel
- Best outside spikers
  (Cuba) Miguel Ángel López
  (Canada) Brandon Koppers
- Best middle blockers
  (Cuba) José Israel Masso
  (Dominican Republic) Dawilin Ramill Méndez
- Best opposite spiker

(Dominican Republic) Henry Tapia

- Best libero
  (Puerto Rico) Dennis Del Valle

== See also ==
- 2021 Women's NORCECA Volleyball Championship
