= Trinity Western Spartans men's volleyball =

Canadian university volleyball team

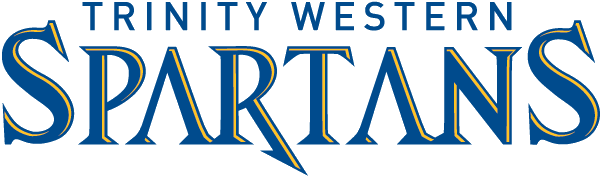
- Founded: 1999–00
- University: Trinity Western University
- Athletic director: Jeff Gamache
- Head coach: Adam Schriemer (3rd season)
- Conference: Canada West
- Location: Langley, British Columbia
- Home arena: Langley Events Centre
- Colors: Blue and Gold

The Trinity Western Spartans men's volleyball team is a university varsity volleyball program in Canada that represents Trinity Western University, competing in the Canada West Universities Athletics Association of U Sports. Based out of Langley, British Columbia, the Spartans play their home games at the Langley Events Centre, a multi-sport facility close to the main campus. Led by then head coach Ron Pike, the Spartans won their first ever National Championship in 2006, defeating the University of Alberta Golden Bears in the final by a score of 3–0. Since then, the Spartans have won six more championships, for a total of seven, hoisting the Tantramar Trophy again in 2011, 2012, 2016, 2017, 2019, and 2023. The Spartans were led by head coach Ben Josephson from 2007 to 2022 before he took over as the head coach for Canada's men's volleyball program. Adam Schriemer is now the head coach. In the Canada West conference, the Spartans have won the league title seven times, taking the conference championship in 2007, 2012, 2016, 2017, 2018, 2020, and 2022.

== History ==
=== Ron Pike era ===
From 1999 to 2007, Ron Pike led the Spartans men's volleyball team into a new era of competition, as Trinity Western University joined the Canada West conference in 1999. Pike led the program to their first ever post-season berth in 2002, and the program's first ever post-season series win in 2004. That same year, 2003–04, the Spartans earned their first ever national championship berth and went on to win the bronze medal at the national tournament. The following season, Pike led the Spartans to their first national championship final, eventually losing to the Alberta Golden Bears. The following season, 2005–06, the Spartans won the men's volleyball program's first ever National Championship, beating Alberta in straight sets.

During his eight seasons of coaching in Canada West, Pike amassed a total record of 102–92, winning four Canada West medals and three national championship medals.

On two occasions, athletes under Ron Pike were nominated for the BLG Award (now known as the Lieutenant Governor Athletic Award) as the top male athlete across all Canadian university sports. Chris Meehan was nominated in 2005-2006 and Josh Howatson was nominated in 2006–07. Howatson would go on to win the BLG award, the school's first ever recipient of this honour. That season, Howatson also captured the program's first ever National Player of the Year award.

=== Ben Josephson era ===
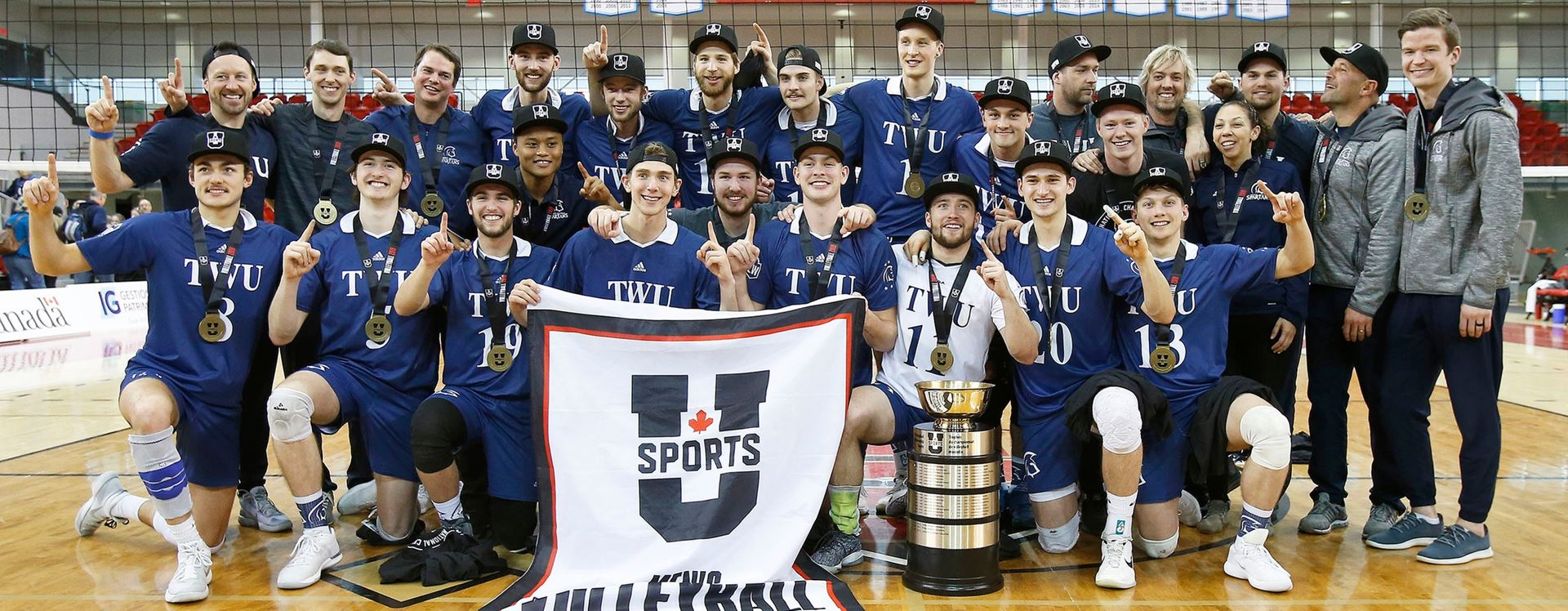
TWU crowned the 2019 National Champions

Ben Josephson was the Spartans head coach from 2007 to 2022, after being an assistant coach from 2004 to 2007. Building upon the championship foundation laid by Ron Pike, Josephson took the program to new heights as he guided TWU to five national championships, winning in 2011, 2012, 2016, 2017 and 2019. Josephson has also led the Spartans to six Canada West championships, winning in 2012, 2016, 2017, 2018, 2020 and 2022, which includes TWU's current run of 10 straight appearances in the conference final.

During Josephson's tenure, the program produced six U Sports Player of the Year award winners, including Ben Ball (2011–12), Nick Del Bianco (2014–15), Ryan Sclater (2016–17), Adam Schriemer (2016–17), Eric Loeppky (2019–20) and Derek Epp (2021–22). The Spartans have also had two winners of the U Sports Rookie of the Year award, with Adam Schriemer winning in 2013–14 and Eric Loeppky winning in 2016–17. With Josephson at the helm, the Spartans had three players nominated for the BLG Award, with Ben Ball nominated in 2011–12, Ryan Sclater nominated in 2016–17 and Derek Epp nominated in 2021–22. The program has also produced six Olympians, as men's volleyball alumni Rudy Verhoeff, Steve Marshall, Daniel Jansen Van Doorn, Lucas Van Berkel and Ryan Sclater have represented Canada's national indoor volleyball team, and Chaim Schalk has represented Canada's beach volleyball team.

Over his career with TWU, Josephson was named both the Canada West Coach of the Year and U Sports Coach of the Year four times, in 2011–12, 2013–14, 2019–20 and 2021–22. Before moving to the sidelines, Josephson was a stand-out player for the Spartans from 1998 to 2003 and, in his final year, earned the school's first ever All-Canadian award while, in that same year, also being named a Canada West First Team All-Star.

== International competition ==
The Spartans have competed several times against international competition, including representing Canada five times - at the FIVB Club World Championships in 2011, the 2012 Men's U23 Pan-American Volleyball Cup, the 2018 FISU America Games, the 2019 CAN-AM Holiday Showcase, and the 2021 Pan American Cup.

=== 2011 FIVB Club World Championship ===
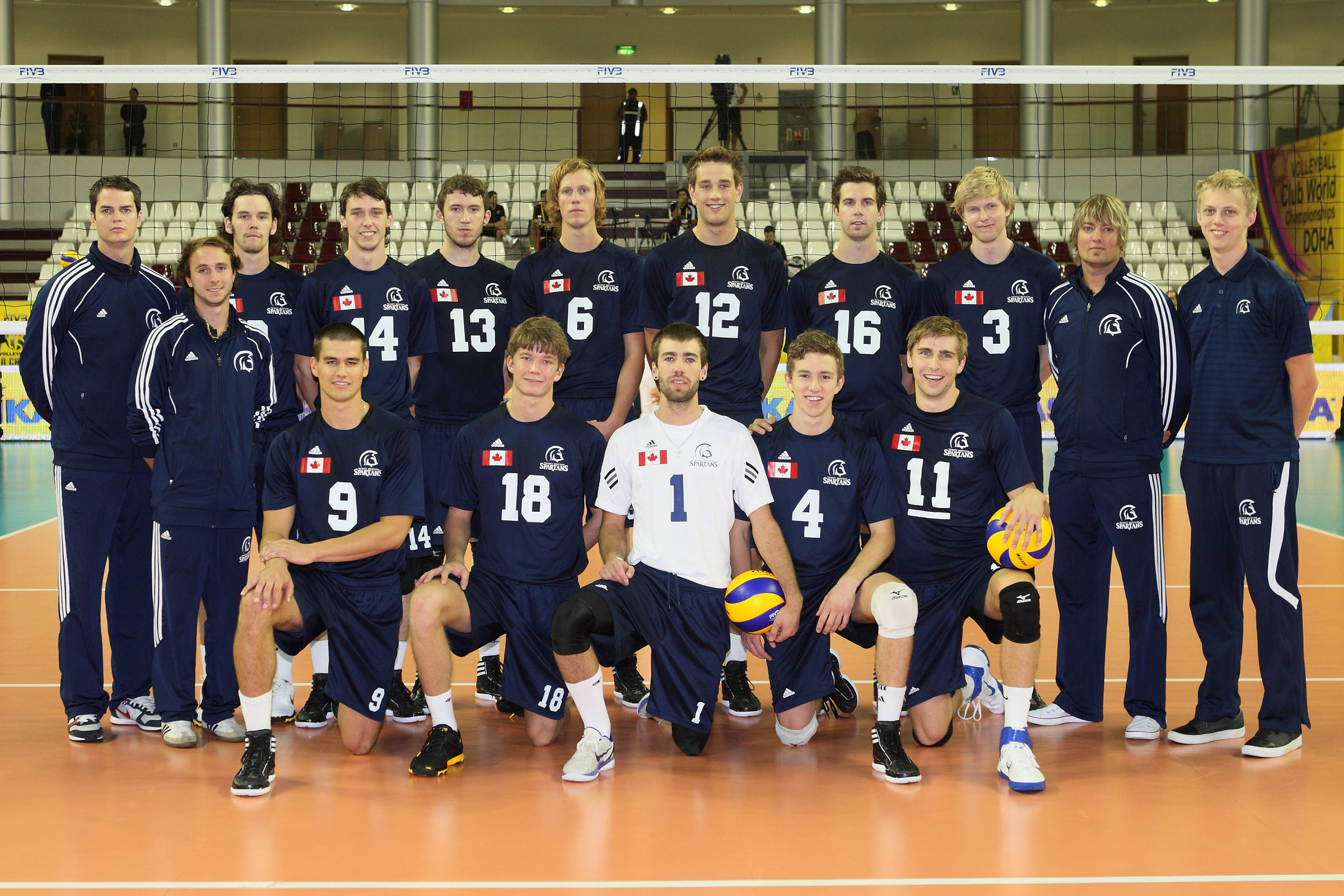
TWU competing at the 2011 FIVB Men's Club World Championships

The Spartans travelled to Doha, Qatar in 2011 after being invited to take part in the FIVB Men's Club World Championships. The Spartans were the North American representatives for the 2011 edition of the tournament. The annual tournament features many of the top professional club teams in the world. The Spartans finished that tournament with a 1–2 record, with a win over Iranian champion Paykan Tehran and losses to Russia's Zenit Kazan and Poland's KS Jastrzebski Wegiel.

=== 2012 Men's U23 Pan-American Volleyball Cup ===
In 2012, the Spartans were awarded the chance to represent Canada for the U23 Pan American Men's Volleyball Cup. The matches were played at the Langley Events Centre, home of the Spartans. In round robin play, the Spartans finished with two wins and two losses. They finished fourth overall at the tournament, earning wins over the Dominican Republic and Mexico in round robin play before losing to Brazil in the semifinal, and the Dominican Republic in the bronze medal match.

=== 2018 FISU America Games ===
The Spartans represented Canada again in 2018 at the inaugural FISU America Games in São Paulo, Brazil. The FISU America Games is a Pan American branch of the FISU World University Games. At the tournament, the Spartans finished with a 1–1 record in pool play. They lost 3–0 to Brazil in the semifinals but went on to beat Mexico 3–2 in the bronze medal match.

=== 2019 CAN-AM Holiday Showcase ===
In 2019, the Spartans competed in the inaugural CAN-AM Holiday Showcase. The CAN-AM Volleyball Holiday Showcase featured four Canadian teams, with the University of Alberta, McMaster University and Ryerson University joining TWU against then two-time defending NCAA champions Long Beach State University, as well as UCLA, Lewis University and Ohio State University. TWU went a perfect 3–0 during the course of the tournament, beating Long Beach State, UCLA, and Lewis. The tournament was the first time since 2010 that the Spartans had played NCAA competition.

=== 2021 Pan American Cup ===
The Spartans represented Canada at the 2021 Pan American Cup in the Dominican Republic, winning a silver medal. The Spartans finished with a 5–2 overall record, earning wins over Mexico, Dominican Republic (2), Puerto Rico and Suriname. TWU beat the Dominican Republic 3–0 in the semifinals before falling to Mexico in three sets in the gold medal match.

== Venues and facilities ==
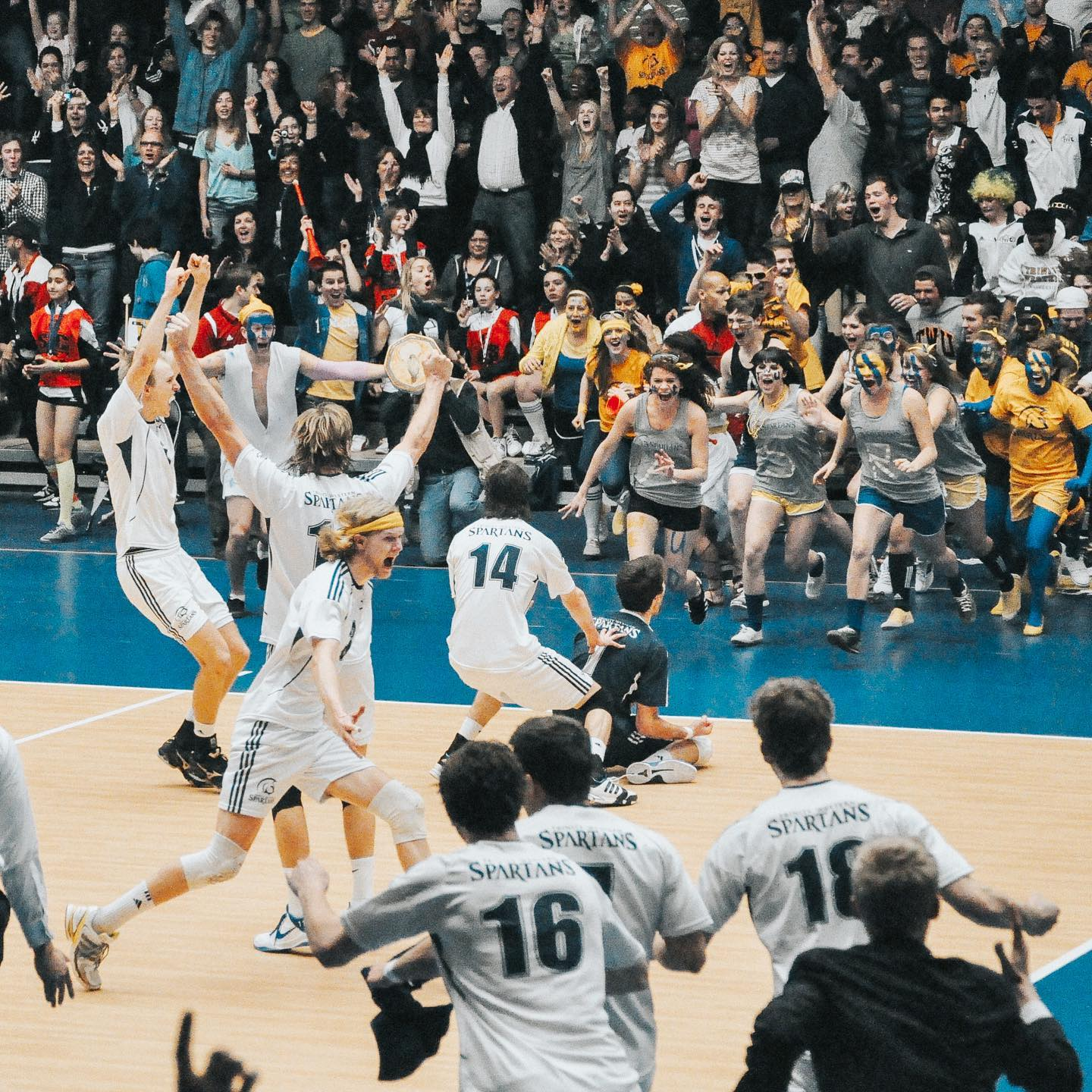
Fans storm the court at the LEC as TWU captures the 2011 National Championship in front of the home crowd

From 1999 to 2009 the Spartans competed at the David E. Enarson Gymnasium on the Trinity Westerns University campus. During the 2010 season, the Spartans and the Spartan Faithful transitioned to the Langley Events Centre (LEC), a multi-purpose facility in the Township of Langley, which is also the home of TWU's basketball, hockey, and rugby teams. Because of the Spartans success and passionate fan base, the LEC has become one of the hardest gyms in the conference for opposing teams to play in. The Spartans men's volleyball program has hosted the National Championship tournament once, in 2011, which was hosted at the Langley Events Centre. That year, the Spartans captured the program's second national championship.

== National Player of the Year ==
As of the end of the 2021–22 season.

Members of the TWU men's volleyball program have been awarded the National Player of the Year Award on seven different occasions.

| Year | Player | Record |
|---|---|---|
| 2006–07 | Josh Howatson | Setter |
| 2011–12 | Ben Ball | Setter |
| 2014–15 | Nick Del Bianco | Outside hitter |
| 2016–17 | Ryan Sclater | Outside hitter |
| 2017–18 | Adam Schriemer | Setter |
| 2019–20 | Eric Loeppky | Outside hitter |
| 2021–22 | Derek Epp | Setter |

== National Coach of the Year ==
As of the end of the 2021–22 season.

| Year | Coach | Record |
|---|---|---|
| 2004–05 | Ron Pike | 19–8 |
| 2011–12 | Ben Josephson | 24–1 |
| 2013–14 | Ben Josephson | 23–4 |
| 2019–20 | Ben Josephson | 25–3 |
| 2021–22 | Ben Josephson | 15–1 |

== Other major award winners ==
As of the end of the 2021–22 season.

| Award | Player | Year |
|---|---|---|
| National Rookie of the Year | Chris Meehan; Adam Schriemer; Eric Loeppky | 2001–02; 2013–14; 2016–17 |
| Dale Iwanoczko Award (Outstanding Student-Athlete) | Josh Howatson; Rudy Verhoeff | 2006–07; 2011–12 |
| Libero of the Year* | Jarrod Offereins | 2011–12 |
| National Championship Tournament MVP | Chris Meehan; Rudy Verhoeff; Ben Ball; Blake Scheerhoorn; Adam Schriemer; Eric Loeppky | 2005–06; 2010–11; 2011–12; 2015–16; 2016–17; 2018–19 |

* denotes award no longer given

== U Sports All-Canadians ==
As of the end of the 2021–22 season.

| All-Canadian Teams | Year | Player |
|---|---|---|
| 1st Team | 2003–04 | Chris Meehan |
| 1st Team | 2005–06 | Josh Howatson; Chris Meehan |
| 1st Team | 2006–07 | Josh Howatson |
| 1st Team | 2011–12 | Ben Ball; Rudy Verhoeff |
| 1st Team | 2012–13 | Nick Del Bianco |
| 1st Team | 2013–14 | Lucas Van Berkel |
| 1st Team | 2014–15 | Nick Del Bianco |
| 1st Team | 2016–17 | Ryan Sclater |
| 1st Team | 2017–18 | Adam Schriemer; Eric Loeppky |
| 1st Team | 2018–19 | Eric Loeppky |
| 1st Team | 2019–20 | Eric Loeppky; Derek Epp |
| 1st Team | 2021–22 | Brodie Hofer; Derek Epp |
| 2nd Team | 2002–03 | Ben Josephson |
| 2nd Team | 2004–05 | Steve Rogalsky |
| 2nd Team | 2006–07 | Steve Rogalsky |
| 2nd Team | 2008–09 | Chaim Schalk |
| 2nd Team | 2010–11 | Rudy Verhoeff |
| 2nd Team | 2013–14 | Nick Del Bianco |
| 2nd Team | 2018–19 | Jacob Kern |

== Lieutenant Governor Athletic Awards ==
Athletes from the men's volleyball program have been nominated on four separate occasions for the Lieutenant Governor Athletic Award (formerly known as the BLG Award), which is given annually to top male and female athletes across all Canadian universities. Chris Meehan was nominated in 2005–06, Josh Howatson was nominated in 2006–07, Ben Ball was nominated in 2011–12, Ryan Sclater was nominated in 2016–17 and Derek Epp was nominated in 2021–22. Howatson went on to win the award as the top Male Athlete in Canada in 2006–07.

== Canada West regular season records ==
As of the end of the 2022–23 season.

| Year | Record | Finish | Conference Playoff Finish |
|---|---|---|---|
| 1999-00 | 5-17 | 5^{th*} | Did not Qualify |
| 2000-01 | 6-16 | 5^{th*} | Did not Qualify |
| 2001-02 | 8-12 | 4^{th*} | Quarterfinals |
| 2002-03 | 9-11 | 5th | Quarterfinals |
| 2003-04 | 12-8 | 4th | Quarterfinals |
| 2004-05 | 14-6 | 2^{nd*} | Silver |
| 2005-06 | 16-4 | 2^{nd*} | Silver |
| 2006-07 | 13-5 | 3rd | Gold |
| 2007-08 | 8-10 | 7th | Quarterfinals |
| 2008-09 | 11-7 | 3rd | Quarterfinals |
| 2009-10 | 11-7 | 4th | Silver |
| 2010-11 | 13-5 | 3rd | Bronze |
| 2011-12 | 19-1 | 1st | Gold |
| 2012-13 | 16-6 | 2nd | Silver |
| 2013-14 | 20-2 | 1st | Silver |
| 2014-15 | 20-4 | 2nd | Silver |
| 2015-16 | 14-10 | 6th | Gold |
| 2016-17 | 21-3 | 2nd | Gold |
| 2017-18 | 22-2 | 1st | Gold |
| 2018-19 | 18-4 | 2nd | Silver |
| 2019-20 | 20-2 | 1st | Gold |
| 2021-22 | 15-1 | 1st | Gold |
| 2022-23 | 18-6 | 3rd | Silver |

*- denotes divisional finish

== Postseason history ==
=== Canada West playoffs results ===
As of the end of the 2021–22 season.

Since beginning Canada West competition in the 1999–00 season, the program has medalled 15 times, including every year from 2010 to 2020, as well as reaching the conference championship match from 2012 to 2020. To date, the program has captured a total of six conference championships which includes: 2007, 2012, 2016, 2017, 2018, and 2020.

| Season | Round | Opponents | Result | Medal |
|---|---|---|---|---|
| 2000 | Did not Qualify | | | |
| 2001 | Did not Qualify | | | |
| 2002 | CW Quarterfinal Series | Calgary | L 2-0 (0–3, 0–3) | |
| 2003 | CW Quarterfinal Series | Manitoba | L 2-0 (0–3, 1–3) | |
| 2004 | CW Semifinal CW Bronze Match | Manitoba Alberta | L 3–1 L 3–0 | Bronze |
| 2005 | CW Quarterfinal Series CW Semifinal CW Championship Final | Winnipeg Saskatchewan Alberta | W 2-0 (3–0, 3–1) W 3–2 L 3–1 | Silver |
| 2006 | CW Quarterfinal Series CW Semifinal CW Championship Final | Winnipeg Saskatchewan Alberta | W 2-0 (3–1, 3–1) W 3–0 L 3–0 | Silver |
| 2007 | CW Quarterfinal Series CW Semifinal CW Championship Final | Saskatchewan Winnipeg UBC | W 2-0 (3–0, 3–0) W 3–2 W 3–1 | Gold |
| 2008 | CW Quarterfinal Series | Winnipeg | L 2-0 (0–3, 0–3) | |
| 2009 | CW Quarterfinal Series | Thompson Rivers | L 2-1 (2–3, 3–1, 2–3) | |
| 2010 | CW Quarterfinal Series CW Semifinal CW Championship Final | Winnipeg Calgary Alberta | W 2-1 (3–1, 0–3, 3–0) W 3–2 L 3–2 | Silver |
| 2011 | CW Quarterfinal Series CW Semifinal CW Bronze | Thompson Rivers Calgary Alberta | W 2-0 (3–0, 3–0) L 3–2 W 3–1 | Bronze |
| 2012 | CW Semifinal CW Championship Final | Calgary Manitoba | W 3–0 W 3–2 | Gold |
| 2013 | CW Quarterfinal Series CW Semifinal CW Championship | Winnipeg UBC Brandon | W 2-0 (3–0, 3–2) W 3–2 L 3–1 | Silver |
| 2014 | CW Semifinal CW Championship Final | Brandon Alberta | W 3–1 L 3–0 | Silver |
| 2015 | CW Quarterfinal Series CW Semifinal CW Championship Final | Thompson Rivers Brandon Alberta | W 2-0 (3–1, 3–0) W 3–1 L 3–1 | Silver |
| 2016 | CW Quarterfinal Series CW Semifinal CW Championship Final | Calgary Alberta Saskatchewan | W 2-1 (1–3, 3–0, 3–1) W 3–0 W 3–1 | Gold |
| 2017 | CW Quarterfinal Series CW Semifinal CW Championship Final | Winnipeg Alberta Manitoba | W 2-0 (3–0, 3–0) W 3–2 W 3–2 | Gold |
| 2018 | CW Quarterfinal Series CW Semifinal Series CW Championship Final | Thompson Rivers Winnipeg Alberta | W 2-0 (3–1, 3–1) W 2-0 (3–0, 3–0) W 3–1 | Gold |
| 2019 | CW Quarterfinal Series CW Semifinal Series CW Championship Final | UBC Thompson Rivers Brandon | W 2-1 (3–0, 2–3, 3–0) W 2-0 (3–1, 3–0) L 3–2 | Silver |
| 2020 | CW Quarterfinal Series CW Semifinal Series CW Championship Final | Mount Royal Brandon Alberta | W 2-0 (3–0, 3–0) W 2-1 (3–0, 2–3, 3–1) W 3–0 | Gold |
| 2022 | CW Pool A, Game 1 CW Pool A, Game 4 Pool A, Game 6 Pool D, Game 1 Pool D, Game 3 CW Semifinal CW Championship Final | Thompson Rivers Mount Royal Brandon Saskatchewan Calgary Brandon Alberta | W 3–0 W 3–0 W 3–2 W 3–0 W 3–0 W 3–0 W 3–1 | Gold |

=== U Sports Championship Tournament results ===
As of the end of the 2021–22 season.

The men's volleyball program reached the national championship tournament for the first time in program history in 2004 where they earned the bronze medal. In total, the program has won 12 national tournament medals, which included a run of five straight years in which the Spartans won either a gold or silver medal (2015 to 2019). The program has captured the National Championship six times, including in 2006, 2011, 2012, 2016, 2017 and 2019. Heading into the 2020 National Championship, the Spartans earned the number one seed having captured the Canada West Championship and a league-best record of 20–2, but were unable to compete for their fourth championship in five years when the tournament was cancelled due to the COVID-19 global pandemic.

| Season | Round | Opponents | Result | Medal |
|---|---|---|---|---|
| 2000 | Did not Qualify | | | |
| 2001 | Did not Qualify | | | |
| 2002 | Did not Qualify | | | |
| 2003 | Did not Qualify | | | |
| 2004 | CIS Quarterfinal CIS Semifinal CIS Bronze | Laval Saskatchewan Manitoba | W 3–1 L 3–0 W 3–1 | Bronze |
| 2005 | CIS Quarterfinal CIS Semifinal CIS Championship Final | York Saskatchewan Alberta | W 3–1 W 3–0 L 3–2 | Silver |
| 2006 | CIS Quarterfinal CIS Semifinal CIS Championship Final | Queen's Manitoba Alberta | W 3–0 W 3–2 W 3–0 | Gold |
| 2007 | CIS Quarterfinal CIS Semifinal CIS Bronze | McMaster Alberta UBC | W 3–2 L 3–2 W 3–0 | Bronze |
| 2008 | Did not Qualify | | | |
| 2009 | Did not Qualify | | | |
| 2010 | CIS Quarterfinal CIS Semifinal CIS Championship Final | Queen's Laval Calgary | W 3–0 W 3–2 L 3–1 | Silver |
| 2011 | CIS Quarterfinal CIS Semifinal CIS Championship Final | Alberta Calgary Brandon | W 3–2 W 3–2 W 3–0 | Gold |
| 2012 | CIS Quarterfinal CIS Semifinal CIS Championship Final | Dalhousie Queen's Laval | W 3–0 W 3–0 W 3–1 | Gold |
| 2013 | CIS Quarterfinal CIS Consolation Semifinal CIS Consolation Final | Western UNB Alberta | L 3–2 W 3–2 L 3–1 | |
| 2014 | CIS Quarterfinal CIS Consolation Semifinal CIS Consolation Final | Western Calgary Dalhousie | L 3–2 W 3–1 W 3–1 | |
| 2015 | CIS Quarterfinal CIS Semifinal CIS Championship Final | Laval McMaster Alberta | W 3–0 W 3–1 L 3–0 | Silver |
| 2016 | CIS Quarterfinal CIS Semifinal CIS Championship Final | Ryerson Alberta McMaster | W 3–1 W 3–2 W 3–1 | Gold |
| 2017 | U Sports Quarterfinal U Sports Semifinal U Sports Championship Final | Waterloo McMaster Alberta | W 3–0 W 3–1 W 3–1 | Gold |
| 2018 | U Sports Quarterfinal U Sports Semifinal U Sports Championship Final | Windsor McMaster UBC | W 3–1 W 3–1 L 3–0 | Silver |
| 2019 | U Sports Quarterfinal U Sports Semifinal U Sports Championship Final | McMaster Laval Brandon | W 3–1 W 3–2 W 3–0 | Gold |
| 2020 | Cancelled (COVID-19) | | | |
| 2021 | Cancelled (COVID-19) | | | |
| 2022 | U Sports Quarterfinal U Sports Semifinal U Sports Championship Final | Manitoba Sherbrooke Alberta | W 3–0 W 3–0 L 3–1 | Silver |

== Record vs. Canada West opponents ==
All-time series record includes conference matches and postseason results from 1999 to 2020.

| Canada West Opponent | Overall Record | Conference Record |
|---|---|---|
| Alberta Golden Bears | 30–57 | 13–39 |
| Brandon Bobcats | 24–15 | 18–10 |
| Calgary Dinos | 44–27 | 35–23 |
| MacEwan Griffins | 12–0 | 12–0 |
| Manitoba Bisons | 26–21 | 22–18 |
| Mount Royal Cougars | 19–4 | 14–2 |
| Regina Cougars | 37–1 | 37–1 |
| Saskatchewan Huskies | 37–19 | 32–14 |
| Thompson Rivers Wolfpack | 54–13 | 27–5 |
| UBC Okanagan Heat | 32–1 | 18–0 |
| UBC Thunderbirds | 52–23 | 40–16 |
| Winnipeg Wesmen | 41–18 | 30–12 |

== Spartans representing Team Canada ==
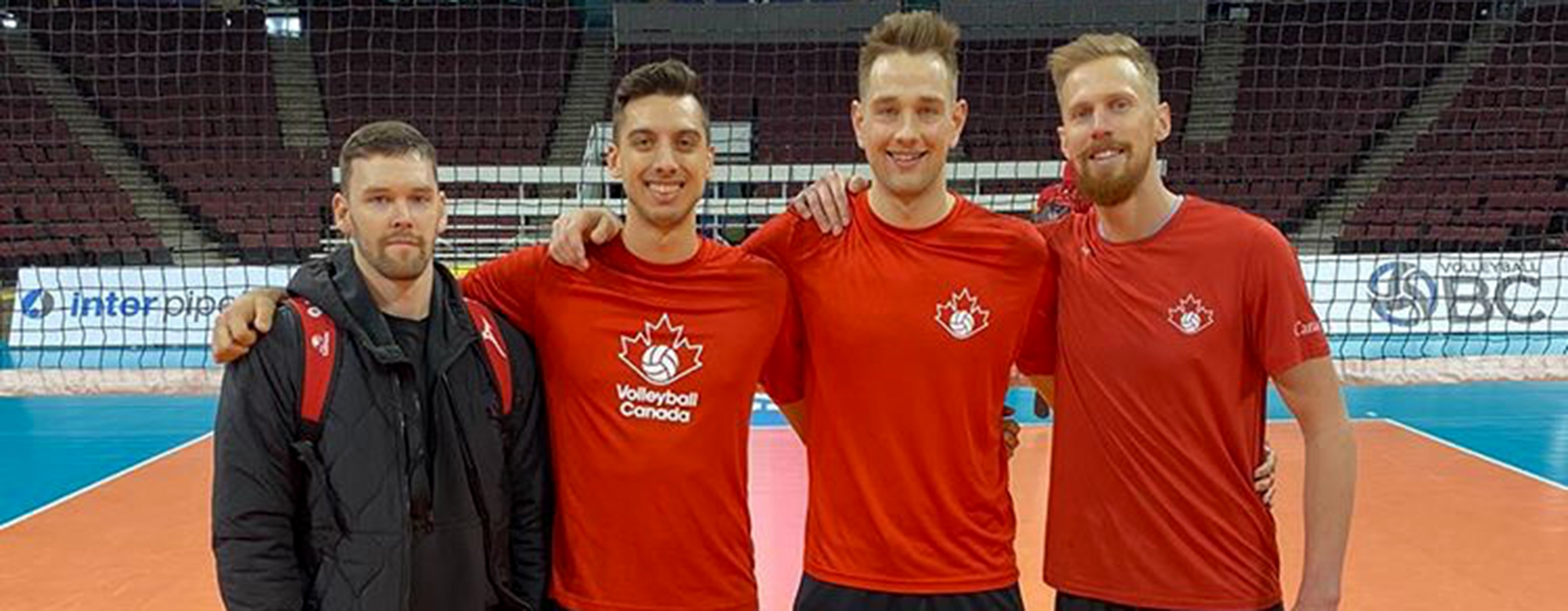
MVB Alum Marshall, Sclater, Van Berkel and Jansen Van Doorn (left to right) representing Canada in 2020.

TWU has seen may athletes go on to compete for the senior national team, both in beach volleyball and indoor volleyball at several levels including the Canadian youth national team, junior national team, FISU Summer Games Team, senior national ‘B’ team, senior national team, and Canadian beach national team. The Spartans have also had four athletes compete at the Olympic Summer Games, with Daniel Jansen Van Doorn (indoor), Steven Marshall (indoor), Rudy Verhoeff (indoor), and Chaim Schalk (beach) representing Team Canada at the 2016 Rio Olympics.

Four Spartans helped team Canada qualify for the 2020 Tokyo Olympics (postponed to 2021), with Steven Marshall, Ryan Sclater, Lucas Van Berkel, and Daniel Jansen Van Doorn contributing to the team's qualification in January 2020 in Vancouver, BC.

| Senior National Team Athletes | Josh Howatson, Steven Marshall, Dan Jansen Van Doorn, Derek Epp Ryan Sclater, Doug Van Spronsen, Rudy Verhoeff, Lucas Van Berkel, Chris Meehan, Blake Scheerhoorn, Adam Schriemer, Eric Loeppky, Brodie Hofer Mathias Elser, Jesse Elser, Pearce Eshenko, Jackson Howe |
| Junior National Team Athletes | Josh Doornenbal, Rudy Verhoeff, Marc Howatson, Josh Howatson, Chris Meehan, Justin Pankratz, Jeff Lindemulder, Mark Huberts, Chris Roy, Steve Rogalsky, Doug Van Spronsen, Lucas Van Berkel, Brad Kufske, Brandon Schmidt, Derek Thiessen, Tyler Koslowsky, Adam Schriemer, Blake Scheerhoorn, Jacob Kern, Pearce Eshenko, Jesse Elser, Eric Loeppky, Brodie Hofer, Mathias Elser |

== TWU Spartans professional volleyball careers ==
Several athletes from the men's volleyball program have gone on to play professionally in leagues around Europe and the rest of the world.

- Steve Marshall – Nice Volley-Ball (France)
- Derek Epp – Arago de Sète (France)
- Jackson Howe – Stade Poitevin Poitiers (France)
- Lucas Van Berkel – Tourcoing Lille Métropole (France)
- Ryan Sclater – Arago de Sète (France)
- Chaim Schalk – AVP Beach Volleyball (USA)
- Eric Loeppky – Gioiella Prisma Taranto (Italy)
- Pearce Eschenko – SVG Lüneburg (Germany)
- Jacob Kern – Lycurgus Volleyball (Netherlands)
- Jordan Schnitzer – SVG Lüneburg (Germany)
- Tyler Koslowsky – 2016–2022
- Rudy Verhoeff – 2013–2021
- Daniel Jansen Van Doorn – 2013–2020
- Blake Scheerhoorn – 2016–2020
- Adam Schriemer – 2018–2019
- Danny Grant – 2016–2019
- Nick Del Bianco – 2015–2019
- Josh Howatson – 2007–2019
- Stephen Nash – 2009–2017

== Media ==
Trinity Western Spartan men's volleyball matches in the Canada West Universities Athletic Association conference can be seen live on www.Canadawest.tv.
