= 2027 U Sports Women's Volleyball Championship =

Canadian university volleyball championship

- Season: 2026–27
- Teams: Eight
- Finals site: Goldring Centre for High Performance Sport; Toronto, Ontario
- Television: CBC Gem

The 2027 U Sports Women's Volleyball Championship is scheduled to be held March 19–21, 2027, in Toronto, Ontario, to determine a national champion for the 2026–27 U Sports women's volleyball season.

== Host ==
The tournament is scheduled to be hosted by the University of Toronto at the Goldring Centre for High Performance Sport on its St. George campus. This would be the third time that Toronto has hosted the tournament with the others coming in 1995 and 2015.

== Scheduled teams ==
- Canada West Representative
- OUA Representative
- RSEQ Representative
- AUS Representative
- Host (Toronto Varsity Blues)
- One assigned berth to Canada West
- One assigned berth to OUA
- One assigned berth to RSEQ

== Championship bracket ==
First Round: March 19
1
8
4
5
2
7
3
6

Semi-Finals: March 20

Gold Medal Game: March 21
Bronze Medal Game: March 21

== Consolation bracket ==
Semi-Finals: March 20

Fifth Place Game: March 21
