= 2022 U Sports Women's Volleyball Championship =

- Season: 2021–22
- Teams: Eight
- Finals site: Jack Simpson Gymnasium; Calgary, Alberta
- Champions: Trinity Western Spartans (2nd title)
- Runner-up: Mount Royal Cougars
- Winning coach: Ryan Hofer (2nd title)
- Championship MVP: Avery Heppell (Trinity Western)
- Television: CBC

The 2022 U Sports Women's Volleyball Championship was held March 25–27, 2022, in Calgary, Alberta, to determine a national champion for the 2021–22 U Sports women's volleyball season. The top-seeded Trinity Western Spartans defeated the seventh-seeded Mount Royal Cougars to win the second championship in program history.

== Host ==
The tournament was played at Jack Simpson Gymnasium at the University of Calgary. This was the fifth time that Calgary has hosted the tournament with the most recent occurring in 2007. Calgary had previously been awarded the hosting duties for the 2020 championship, but that event was cancelled due to the COVID-19 pandemic in Canada.

== Participating teams ==
Seed	Team	Qualified	Record	Last	Total
1	Trinity Western Spartans	Canada West Champion	15–1	2015	1
2	Brock Badgers	OUA Champion	13–0	None	0
3	Alberta Pandas	Canada West Finalist	16–2	2007	7
4	Toronto Varsity Blues	OUA Finalist	12–0	2016	1
5	McGill Martlets	RSEQ Champion	9–3	None	0
6	Dalhousie Tigers	AUS Champion	9–5	1982	1
7	Mount Royal Cougars	Canada West Bronze	14–4	None	0
8	Calgary Dinos	Canada West Round-of-Six (Host)	5–13	2004	3

== Championship bracket ==
First Round: March 25
1	Trinity Western Spartans	3
8	Calgary Dinos	1
4	Toronto Varsity Blues	1
5	McGill Martlets	3
2	Brock Badgers	0
7	Mount Royal Cougars	3
3	Alberta Pandas	3
6	Dalhousie Tigers	1

Semi-Finals: March 26
1	Trinity Western Spartans	3
5	McGill Martlets	0
3	Alberta Pandas	0
7	Mount Royal Cougars	3

Gold Medal Game: March 27
1	Trinity Western Spartans	3
7	Mount Royal Cougars	1
Bronze Medal Game: March 27
3	Alberta Pandas	3
5	McGill Martlets	0

=== Bronze medal match ===
27 March 2022; 3:00 p.m. MDT	(3) Alberta Pandas	3–0	(5) McGill Martlets	Jack Simpson Gymnasium, Calgary; Attendance: 223; Referees: Jason Dodd, Nik Fuess
27 March 2022; 3:00 p.m. MDT	(25–8, 25–22, 25–17); Boxscore			Jack Simpson Gymnasium, Calgary; Attendance: 223; Referees: Jason Dodd, Nik Fuess

=== Gold medal match ===
27 March 2022; 6:00 p.m. MDT	(1) Trinity Western Spartans	3–1	(7) Mount Royal Cougars	Jack Simpson Gymnasium, Calgary; Attendance: 1,486; Referees: Semara Sevor, Andrew Cameron
27 March 2022; 6:00 p.m. MDT	(25–14, 14–25, 25–19, 25–20); Boxscore			Jack Simpson Gymnasium, Calgary; Attendance: 1,486; Referees: Semara Sevor, Andrew Cameron

== Consolation bracket ==
Semi-Finals: March 26
4	Toronto Varsity Blues	3
8	Calgary Dinos	2
2	Brock Badgers	3
6	Dalhousie Tigers	1

Fifth Place Game: March 27
2	Brock Badgers	1
4	Toronto Varsity Blues	3

== Awards ==
=== Championship awards ===
- Championship MVP – Avery Heppell, Trinity Western
- R.W. Pugh Fair Play Award – Kenzie Vaandering, Calgary

=== Mikasa Top Performers Presented by Nike Team ===
- Trinity Western: Avery Heppell
- Mount Royal: Haley Roe

=== All-Star Team ===
- Victoria Iannotti, McGill
- Kory White, Alberta
- Haley Roe, Mount Royal
- Quinn Pelland, Mount Royal
- Savannah Purdy, Trinity Western
- Ansah Odoom, Trinity Western
