= 2007 CIS Women's Volleyball Championship =

- Season: 2006–07
- Teams: Eight
- Finals site: Jack Simpson Gymnasium; Calgary, Alberta
- Champions: Alberta Pandas (7th title)
- Runner-up: Laval Rouge et Or
- Winning coach: Laurie Eisler (6th title)
- Championship MVP: Tiffany Dodds (Alberta Pandas)

The 2007 CIS Women's Volleyball Championship was held March 1, 2007 to March 3, 2007, in Calgary, Alberta, to determine a national champion for the 2006–07 CIS women's volleyball season. The tournament was played at the Jack Simpson Gymnasium and was hosted by the University of Calgary. This was the fourth time that the University of Calgary had hosted the tournament, including the previous year's championship in 2006.

The Canada West champion Alberta Pandas defeated the defending champion Laval Rouge et Or in the gold medal match to win the championship. The Pandas claimed their seventh national championship in program history which tied the Winnipeg Wesmen for the most in Canadian Interuniversity Sport history.

== Participating teams ==
Seed	Team	Qualified	Record	Last	Total
1	Alberta Pandas	Canada West Champion	16–4	2000	6
2	Laval Rouge et Or	QSSF Champion	21–4	2006	1
3	Manitoba Bisons	Canada West Finalist	18–2	2002	5
4	Montreal Carabins	QSSF Finalist	23–2	None	0
5	Calgary Dinos	Canada West Bronze (Host)	15–5	2004	3
6	Trinity Western Spartans	Canada West Semi-Finalist	15–5	None	0
7	Ottawa Gee-Gees	OUA Champion	13–6	None	0
8	Saint Mary's Huskies	AUS Champion	11–10	None	0

== Championship bracket ==
First Round: March 1
1	Alberta Pandas	3
8	Saint Mary's Huskies	0
4	Montreal Carabins	1
5	Calgary Dinos	3
2	Laval Rouge et Or	3
7	Ottawa Gee-Gees	1
3	Manitoba Bisons	2
6	Trinity Western Spartans	3

Semi-Finals: March 2
1	Alberta Pandas	3
5	Calgary Dinos	2
2	Laval Rouge et Or	3
6	Trinity Western Spartans	0

Gold Medal Game: March 3
1	Alberta Pandas	3
2	Laval Rouge et Or	1
Bronze Medal Game: March 3
5	Calgary Dinos	3
6	Trinity Western Spartans	0

== Consolation bracket ==
Semi-Finals: March 2
3	Manitoba Bisons	2
7	Ottawa Gee-Gees	3
4	Montreal Carabins	3
8	Saint Mary's Huskies	0

Fifth Place Game: March 3
4	Montreal Carabins	3
7	Ottawa Gee-Gees	0

== Awards ==
=== Championship awards ===
- CIS Tournament MVP – Tiffany Dodds, Alberta
- R.W. Pugh Fair Play Award – Rachel Runnels, Ottawa

=== All-Star Team ===
- Tiffany Dodds, Alberta
- Jocelyn Blair, Alberta
- Marylène Laplante, Laval
- Marie-Christine Mondor, Laval
- Joanna Niemczewska, Calgary
- Darryl Roper, Alberta
- Julie Young, Calgary
