= 2015 CIS Women's Volleyball Championship =

Canadian university volleyball championship

- Season: 2014–15
- Teams: Eight
- Finals site: Goldring Centre for High Performance Sport; Toronto, Ontario
- Champions: Trinity Western Spartans (1st title)
- Runner-up: Alberta Pandas
- Winning coach: Ryan Hofer (1st title)
- Championship MVP: Nikki Cornwall (Trinity Western Spartans)

The 2015 CIS Women's Volleyball Championship was held February 26, 2015, to March 1, 2015, in Toronto, Ontario, to determine a national champion for the 2014–15 CIS women's volleyball season. The tournament was played at the Goldring Centre for High Performance Sport at the University of Toronto. It was the second time that the University of Toronto had hosted the tournament, with the other instance occurring in 1996. This was the last championship tournament to be played over four days as the format shifted back to three days starting in 2016. This was also the last championship to be played in February, as the CIS shifted the championship schedule two weeks ahead in 2016.

The top-seeded Canada West Champion Trinity Western Spartans defeated the second-seeded Alberta Pandas in the gold medal match to win the first women's volleyball national championship in program history. The Spartans came back from a 0–2 set deficit to win the national title in exactly the same manner that they won the Canada West title – by overcoming a two-set deficit to the Alberta Pandas.

== Participating teams ==
Seed	Team	Qualified	Record	Last	Total
1	Trinity Western Spartans	Canada West Champion	19–5	None	0
2	Alberta Pandas	Canada West Finalist	19–5	2007	7
3	Toronto Varsity Blues	OUA Champion (Host)	18–1	None	0
4	Montreal Carabins	RSEQ Champion	15–4	None	0
5	UBC Thunderbirds	Canada West Bronze	13–11	2013	10
6	Dalhousie Tigers	AUS Champion	10–6	1982	1
7	Ottawa Gee-Gees	OUA Finalist	16–3	None	0
8	Laval Rouge et Or	RSEQ Finalist	13–6	2006	1

== Championship bracket ==
First Round: February 26
1	Trinity Western Spartans	3
8	Laval Rouge et Or	2
4	Montreal Carabins	3
5	UBC Thunderbirds	0
2	Alberta Pandas	3
7	Ottawa Gee-Gees	0
3	Toronto Varsity Blues	3
6	Dalhousie Tigers	0

Semi-Finals: February 28
1	Trinity Western Spartans	3
4	Montreal Carabins	0
2	Alberta Pandas	3
3	Toronto Varsity Blues	2

Gold Medal Game: March 1
1	Trinity Western Spartans	3
2	Alberta Pandas	2
Bronze Medal Game: March 1
3	Toronto Varsity Blues	2
4	Montreal Carabins	3

== Consolation bracket ==
Semi-Finals: February 27
5	UBC Thunderbirds	3
8	Laval Rouge et Or	0
6	Dalhousie Tigers	0
7	Ottawa Gee-Gees	3

Fifth Place Game: March 1
5	UBC Thunderbirds	0
7	Ottawa Gee-Gees	3

== Awards ==
=== Championship awards ===
- CIS Tournament MVP – Nikki Cornwall, Trinity Western
- R.W. Pugh Fair Play Award – Madelyn Mandryk, Toronto

=== All-Star Team ===
- Jennifer Neilson, Toronto
- Marie-Alex Bélanger, Montreal
- Jessie Niles, Alberta
- Dione Lang, Alberta
- Nikki Cornwall, Trinity Western
- Alicia Perrin, Trinity Western
- Elizabeth Wendel, Trinity Western
