= 2028 U Sports Women's Volleyball Championship =

Canadian university volleyball championship

- Season: 2027–28
- Teams: Eight
- Finals site: Kenyon Court; Calgary, Alberta

The 2028 U Sports Women's Volleyball Championship is scheduled to be held in March 2028, in Calgary, Alberta, to determine a national champion for the 2027–28 U Sports women's volleyball season.

== Host ==
The tournament is scheduled to be hosted by Mount Royal University at the Kenyon Court on the school's campus. It will be the first women's tournament to be hosted by Mount Royal.

== Scheduled teams ==
- Canada West Representative
- OUA Representative
- RSEQ Representative
- AUS Representative
- Host (Mount Royal Cougars)
- Three additional berths
