= Brianna Beamish =

Canadian volleyball player (born 1995)

Personal information
- Nationality: Canada
- Born: 4 September 1993 (age 33); Surrey, British Columbia
- Height: 1.80 m (5 ft 11 in)
- Spike: 300 cm (120 in)
- Block: 286 cm (113 in)
- Education: UBC Okanagan Heat

Volleyball information
- Position: Position 4

Career
Years	Teams
2017	RC Cannes
2018	TS Volley Dudingen

National team
2016 – present	Canada

Brianna Beamish (born 4 September 1993 Surrey, Canada) is a Canadian volleyball player. She was part of the Canada women's national volleyball team, and participated at the 2017 FIVB Volleyball Women's World Grand Prix, and 2018 FIVB Volleyball Women's World Championship. She played CIS women's volleyball for the UBC Okanagan Heat for five seasons from 2011 to 2016. She finished her university career by contributing to the Heat's Bronze medal win in the 2016 CIS Women's Volleyball Championship.

On a club level she plays for TS Volley Dudingen.
