= 2023 U Sports Women's Volleyball Championship =

Canadian university volleyball championship

- Season: 2022–23
- Teams: Eight
- Finals site: War Memorial Gymnasium; Vancouver, British Columbia
- Champions: UBC Thunderbirds (13th title)
- Runner-up: Trinity Western Spartans
- Winning coach: Doug Reimer (10 title)
- Championship MVP: Elise Petit (UBC)
- Television: CBC

The 2023 U Sports Women's Volleyball Championship was held March 17–19, 2023, in Vancouver, British Columbia, to determine a national champion for the 2022–23 U Sports women's volleyball season. In a match between the two most recent champions, the host UBC Thunderbirds defeated the top-seeded Trinity Western Spartans to win the program's 13th national championship.

== Host ==
The tournament was played at War Memorial Gymnasium at the University of British Columbia. This was the third time that UBC had hosted the tournament with the most recent occurring in 1983. UBC had previously been awarded the hosting duties for the 2021 championship, but that event was cancelled due to the COVID-19 pandemic in Canada.

== Participating teams ==
Seed	Team	Qualified	Record	Last	Total
1	Trinity Western Spartans	Canada West Champion	22–2	2022	2
2	Brock Badgers	OUA Champion	18–2	None	0
3	Mount Royal Cougars	Canada West Finalist	19–5	None	0
4	UQAM Citadins	RSEQ Champion	13–5	None	0
5	Dalhousie Tigers	AUS Champion	17–3	1982	1
6	Manitoba Bisons	Canada West Bronze	14–10	2014	7
7	UBC Thunderbirds	Canada West Quarterfinalist (Host)	18–6	2019	12
8	McGill Martlets	RSEQ Finalist	12–6	None	0

== Championship bracket ==
First Round: March 17
1	Trinity Western Spartans	3
8	McGill Martlets	1
4	UQAM Citadins	0
5	Dalhousie Tigers	3
2	Brock Badgers	1
7	UBC Thunderbirds	3
3	Mount Royal Cougars	2
6	Manitoba Bisons	3

Semi-Finals: March 18
1	Trinity Western Spartans	3
5	Dalhousie Tigers	0
6	Manitoba Bisons	1
7	UBC Thunderbirds	3

Gold Medal Game: March 19
1	Trinity Western Spartans	2
7	UBC Thunderbirds	3
Bronze Medal Game: March 19
5	Dalhousie Tigers	3
6	Manitoba Bisons	2

=== Bronze medal match ===
19 March 2023; 2:00 p.m. PDT	(4) Dalhousie Tigers	3–2	(5) Manitoba Bisons	War Memorial Gymnasium; Vancouver, British Columbia; Attendance: 982
19 March 2023; 2:00 p.m. PDT	(21–25, 23–25, 23–25); Boxscore			War Memorial Gymnasium; Vancouver, British Columbia; Attendance: 982

=== Gold medal match ===
19 March 2023; 4:30 p.m. PDT	(1) Trinity Western Spartans	2–3	(7) UBC Thunderbirds	War Memorial Gymnasium; Vancouver, British Columbia; Attendance: 2,089
19 March 2023; 4:30 p.m. PDT	(23–25, 25–22, 25–21, 18–25, 12–15); Boxscore			War Memorial Gymnasium; Vancouver, British Columbia; Attendance: 2,089

== Consolation bracket ==
Semi-Finals: March 18
4	UQAM Citadins	3
8	McGill Martlets	1
2	Brock Badgers	2
3	Mount Royal Cougars	3

Fifth Place Game: March 19
3	Mount Royal Cougars	3
4	UQAM Citadins	0

== Awards ==
=== Championship awards ===
- Championship MVP – Elise Petit, UBC
- R.W. Pugh Fair Play Award – Brett Boldon, Dalhousie

=== Mikasa Players of the Game ===
- UBC: Jayde Robertsen
- Trinity Western: Dora Komlodi

=== All-Star Team ===
- Setter – Dora Komlodi (Trinity Western)
- Libero – Kacey Jost (UBC)
- Left Side – Lucy Glen-Carter (Dalhousie)
- Outside Hitter – Raya Surinx (Manitoba)
- Middle blocker – Jayde Robertsen (UBC)
- Middle blocker – Kaylee Plouffe (Trinity Western)
