= 2014 CIS Women's Volleyball Championship =

- Season: 2013–14
- Teams: Eight
- Finals site: Centre for Kinesiology, Health & Sport; Regina, Saskatchewan
- Champions: Manitoba Bisons (7th title)
- Runner-up: UBC Thunderbirds
- Winning coach: Ken Bentley (6th title)
- Championship MVP: Rachel Cockrell (Manitoba Bisons)

The 2014 CIS Women's Volleyball Championship was held from February 28, 2014 to March 2, 2014, in Regina, Saskatchewan, to determine a national champion for the 2013–14 CIS women's volleyball season. The tournament was played at the Centre for Kinesiology, Health & Sport (CKHS) at the University of Regina. It was the first time that the University of Regina had hosted the tournament.

The second-seeded Manitoba Bisons defeated the six-time defending champion and top-seeded UBC Thunderbirds in the gold-medal match as they won the seventh title in program history. The Bisons swept all three of their opponents during this tournament and won their first championship since 2002. The loss frustrated the Thunderbirds' attempt to win a record-breaking seventh consecutive championship as they finished tied with the Winnipeg Wesmen (1983-1988) and Alberta Pandas (1995-2000) with six straight wins from 2008 to 2013.

== Participating teams ==
Seed	Team	Qualified	Record	Last	Total
1	UBC Thunderbirds	Canada West Champion	18–4	2013	10
2	Manitoba Bisons	Canada West Finalist	14–8	2002	6
3	Trinity Western Spartans	Canada West Bronze	17–5	None	0
4	Laval Rouge et Or	RSEQ Champion	13–6	2006	1
5	McMaster Marauders	OUA Champion	13–6	None	0
6	Dalhousie Tigers	AUS Champion	12–4	1982	1
7	Ottawa Gee-Gees	OUA Finalist	14–5	None	0
8	Regina Cougars	Canada West Quarter-Finalist (Host)	12–10	None	0

== Championship bracket ==
First Round: February 28
1	UBC Thunderbirds	3
8	Regina Cougars	1
4	Laval Rouge et Or	3
5	McMaster Marauders	0
2	Manitoba Bisons	3
7	Ottawa Gee-Gees	0
3	Trinity Western Spartans	1
6	Dalhousie Tigers	3

Semi-Finals: March 1
1	UBC Thunderbirds	3
4	Laval Rouge et Or	1
2	Manitoba Bisons	3
6	Dalhousie Tigers	0

Gold Medal Game: March 2
1	UBC Thunderbirds	0
2	Manitoba Bisons	3
Bronze Medal Game: March 2
4	Laval Rouge et Or	3
6	Dalhousie Tigers	1

== Consolation bracket ==
Semi-Finals: March 1
3	Trinity Western Spartans	3
7	Ottawa Gee-Gees	0
5	McMaster Marauders	0
8	Regina Cougars	3

Fifth Place Game: March 2
3	Trinity Western Spartans	3
8	Regina Cougars	2

== Awards ==
=== Championship awards ===
- CIS Championship MVP – Rachel Cockrell, Manitoba
- R.W. Pugh Fair Play Award – Katherine Ryan, Dalhousie

=== All-Star Team ===
- Lisa Barclay, UBC
- Rachel Cockrell, Manitoba
- Esther Gilbert, Laval
- Brittany Habing, Manitoba
- Abbey Keeping, UBC
- Desiree Nouwen, Dalhousie
- Taylor Pischke, Manitoba
