= 2006 CIS Women's Volleyball Championship =

Canadian university volleyball championship

- Season: 2005–06
- Teams: Eight
- Finals site: Jack Simpson Gymnasium; Calgary, Alberta
- Champions: Laval Rouge et Or (1st title)
- Runner-up: UBC Thunderbirds
- Winning coach: Benoit Robitaille (1st title)
- Championship MVP: Marylène Laplante (Laval Rouge et Or)

The 2006 CIS Women's Volleyball Championship was held March 2, 2006 to March 4, 2006, in Calgary, Alberta, to determine a national champion for the 2005–06 CIS women's volleyball season. The tournament was played at the Jack Simpson Gymnasium and was hosted by the University of Calgary. This was the third time that the University of Calgary had hosted the tournament and the first since 1991.

The QSSF Champion Laval Rouge et Or defeated the Canada West champion UBC Thunderbirds to win the first national championship in program history and the first women's championship in school history. The Rouge et Or finished the season with a perfect 37–0 record. Laval had also appeared in the national tournament every year since 1979, except for 1991, and won the championship in their third appearance in the gold medal game.

== Participating teams ==
Seed	Team	Qualified	Record	Last	Total
1	UBC Thunderbirds	Canada West Champion	19–1	1978	4
2	Laval Rouge et Or	QSSF Champion	21–0	None	0
3	Alberta Pandas	Canada West Finalist	15–5	2000	6
4	Trinity Western Spartans	Canada West Bronze	15–5	None	0
5	Calgary Dinos	Canada West Semi-Finalist (Host)	14–6	2004	3
6	Montreal Carabins	QSSF Finalist	16–5	None	0
7	Windsor Lancers	OUA Champion	12–7	None	0
8	Saint Mary's Huskies	AUS Champion	15–6	None	0

== Championship bracket ==
First Round: March 2
1	UBC Thunderbirds	3
8	Saint Mary's Huskies	1
4	Trinity Western Spartans	0
5	Calgary Dinos	3
2	Laval Rouge et Or	3
7	Windsor Lancers	0
3	Alberta Pandas	2
6	Montreal Carabins	3

Semi-Finals: March 3
1	UBC Thunderbirds	3
5	Calgary Dinos	1
2	Laval Rouge et Or	3
6	Montreal Carabins	0

Gold Medal Game: March 4
1	UBC Thunderbirds	1
2	Laval Rouge et Or	3
Bronze Medal Game: March 4
5	Calgary Dinos	3
6	Montreal Carabins	2

== Consolation bracket ==
Semi-Finals: March 3
3	Alberta Pandas	3
7	Windsor Lancers	0
4	Trinity Western Spartans	3
8	Saint Mary's Huskies	0

Fifth Place Game: March 4
3	Alberta Pandas	2
4	Trinity Western Spartans	3

== Awards ==
=== Championship awards ===
- CIS Tournament MVP – Marylène Laplante, Laval
- R.W. Pugh Fair Play Award – Myriam Aboumerhi, Montréal

=== All-Star Team ===
- Marylène Laplante, Laval
- Amélie Rivet, Laval
- Caroline Fiset, Laval
- Emily Cordonier, UBC
- Shelley Chalmers, UBC
- Julie Young, Calgary
- Laetitia Tchoualak, Montréal
- Neda Boroumand, Calgary
