= Heppell =

Heppell is a surname. Notable people with the surname include:

- Avery Heppel, 2022 U Sports Women's Volleyball Championship MVP
- Bailey Thomas Heppell (born 2000), English Football player
- Bruno Heppell (born 1972), Canadian football player
- Cole Heppell (born 1993), Canadian actor
- Dyson Heppell (born 1992), Australian rules footballer
- George Heppell (1916–1993), English association football player
- John Heppell (born 1948), British politician
- Kate Heppell, actress who played Laura in the 2009 British romantic comedy Public Sex
- Martin Heppell (born 1974), Australian rules footballer
- Maureen Heppell (born 1949), English table tennis player
- Stephen Heppell, British educator and writer

== See also ==
- Thomas Heppell Varty (1921–2004), better known as Tommy Varty, English association football player
