= 2020 U Sports Women's Volleyball Championship =

Canadian university volleyball championship

- Season: 2019–20
- Teams: Eight
- Finals site: Jack Simpson Gymnasium; Calgary, Alberta
- Champions: No champion

The 2020 U Sports Women's Volleyball Championship was scheduled to be held March 13–15, 2020, in Calgary, Alberta, to determine a national champion for the 2019–20 U Sports women's volleyball season. The tournament was cancelled on the first day that games were scheduled to be played due to the COVID-19 pandemic. This was the first time that a national championship had not been played since it was first unofficially contested in 1970.

The entire tournament was to be played at Jack Simpson Gymnasium at the University of Calgary. It would have been the fifth time that Calgary had hosted the tournament with the most recent occurring in 2007.

== Participating teams ==
Seed	Team	Qualified	Record	Last	Total
1	Trinity Western Spartans	Canada West Champion	22–2	2015	1
2	Toronto Varsity Blues	OUA Champion	17–2	2016	1
3	Dalhousie Tigers	AUS Champion	19–1	1982	1
4	Alberta Pandas	Canada West Finalist	18–6	2007	7
5	Mount Royal Cougars	Canada West Bronze	21–3	None	0
6	Montreal Carabins	RSEQ Champion	13–7	None	0
7	Brock Badgers	OUA Finalist	14–5	None	0
8	Calgary Dinos	9th in Canada West (Host)	9–15	2004	4

== Championship bracket ==
First Round: March 13
1	Trinity Western Spartans
8	Calgary Dinos
4	Alberta Pandas
5	Mount Royal Cougars
2	Toronto Varsity Blues
7	Brock Badgers
3	Dalhousie Tigers
6	Montreal Carabins

Semi-Finals: March 14

Gold Medal Game: March 15
Bronze Medal Game: March 15

== Consolation bracket ==
Semi-Finals: March 14

Fifth Place Game: March 15
