= 2026 U Sports Women's Volleyball Championship =

Canadian university volleyball championship

- Season: 2025–26
- Teams: Eight
- Finals site: Langley Events Centre; Langley, British Columbia
- Champions: Alberta Pandas (8th title)
- Runner-up: Sherbrooke Vert et Or
- Winning coach: Carolyn O'Dwyer (1st title)
- Tournament MVP: Abby Guezen (Alberta)
- Television: CBC Gem

The 2026 U Sports Women's Volleyball Championship was held March 13–15, 2026, in Langley, British Columbia, to determine a national champion for the 2025–26 U Sports women's volleyball season. The first-seeded Canada West champion Alberta Pandas defeated the second-seeded RSEQ champion Sherbrooke Vert et Or 3–0 to win the eighth championship in program history.

== Host ==
The tournament was hosted by the Trinity Western University at the Langley Events Centre. This was the first time that Trinity Western has hosted the tournament.

== Scheduled teams ==
Seed	Team	Qualified	Record	Last	Total
1	Alberta Pandas	Canada West Champion	18–2	2007	7
2	Sherbrooke Vert et Or	RSEQ Champion	20–1	2005	2
3	Brock Badgers	OUA Champion	17–3	None	0
4	Trinity Western Spartans	Canada West Finalist (Host)	15–5	2014	7
5	UBC Thunderbirds	Canada West Bronze	17–3	2024	14
6	Saint Mary's Huskies	AUS Champion	10–10	None	0
7	Thompson Rivers WolfPack	Canada West Semifinalist	14–6	None	0
8	Montreal Carabins	RSEQ Finalist	13–8	None	0

\

== Championship bracket ==
First Round: March 13
1	Alberta Pandas	3
8	Montreal Carabins	1
4	Trinity Western Spartans	3
5	UBC Thunderbirds	0
2	Sherbrooke Vert et Or	3
7	Thompson Rivers WolfPack	2
3	Brock Badgers	3
6	Saint Mary's Huskies	0

Semi-Finals: March 14
1	Alberta Pandas	3
4	Trinity Western Spartans	1
2	Sherbrooke Vert et Or	3
3	Brock Badgers	2

Gold Medal Game: March 15
1	Alberta Pandas	3
2	Sherbrooke Vert et Or	0
Bronze Medal Game: March 15
3	Brock Badgers	3
4	Trinity Western Spartans	2

=== Bronze medal match ===
March 15, 2026; 2:00 p.m. PT	(3) Brock Badgers	3–2	(4) Trinity Western Spartans	Langley Events Centre; Langley, British Columbia; Attendance: 700; Referees: Nik Fuess, Ryan Bunyan
March 15, 2026; 2:00 p.m. PT	(25–17, 24–26, 24–26, 25–18, 15–11); Boxscore			Langley Events Centre; Langley, British Columbia; Attendance: 700; Referees: Nik Fuess, Ryan Bunyan

=== Gold medal match ===
March 15, 2026; 6:00 p.m. PT	(1) Alberta Pandas	3–0	(2) Sherbrooke Vert et Or	Langley Events Centre; Langley, British Columbia; Attendance: 1,000; Referees: Samara Sevor, Steve Hewitson
March 15, 2026; 6:00 p.m. PT	(25–13, 25–23, 25–12); Boxscore			Langley Events Centre; Langley, British Columbia; Attendance: 1,000; Referees: Samara Sevor, Steve Hewitson

== Consolation bracket ==
Semi-Finals: March 14
5	UBC Thunderbirds	3
8	Montreal Carabins	1
6	Saint Mary's Huskies	3
7	Thompson Rivers WolfPack	2

Fifth Place Game: March 15
5	UBC Thunderbirds	3
6	Saint Mary's Huskies	2

== Awards ==
=== Championship awards ===
- Championship MVP – Abby Guezen, Alberta

=== Mikasa Players of the Game ===
- Laila Johnston, Alberta
- Danaé Vaillancourt, Sherbrooke

=== All-Star Team ===
- Abby Guezen, Alberta
- Mackenna Knox, Brock
- Justine Kolody, Alberta
- Laila Johnston, Alberta
- Brittanie Maranda, Sherbrooke
- Kaylee Plouffe, Trinity Western
- Danaé Vaillancourt, Sherbrooke

=== R.W. Pugh Fair Play Award ===
- Isabella Samadzadeh, Brock
