= 2021 U Sports Women's Volleyball Championship =

Canadian university volleyball championship

- Season: 2020–21
- Teams: Eight
- Finals site: War Memorial Gymnasium; Vancouver, British Columbia
- Champions: No champion

The 2021 U Sports Women's Volleyball Championship was scheduled to be held March 19–21, 2021, in Vancouver, British Columbia, to determine a national champion for the 2020–21 U Sports women's volleyball season. However, the due to the ongoing COVID-19 pandemic in Canada, it was announced on October 15, 2020 that the tournament was cancelled. It was the second consecutive year that the national championship was cancelled due to the pandemic.

== Host ==
The tournament was scheduled to be played at War Memorial Gymnasium at the University of British Columbia. It would have been the third time that UBC had hosted the tournament with the most recent occurring in 1983. To compensate for the cancelled tournament, UBC was awarded the hosting rights to the 2023 tournament.

== Scheduled teams ==
- Canada West Representative
- OUA Representative
- RSEQ Representative
- AUS Representative
- Host (UBC Thunderbirds)
- Two assigned berths from Canada West
- One assigned berth from OUA
