= 2016 CIS Women's Volleyball Championship =

Canadian university volleyball championship

- Season: 2015–16
- Teams: Eight
- Finals site: Healthy Living Centre; Brandon, Manitoba
- Champions: Toronto Varsity Blues (1st title)
- Runner-up: Trinity Western Spartans
- Winning coach: Kristine Drakich (1st title)
- Championship MVP: Caleigh Cruickshank (Toronto Varsity Blues)

The 2016 CIS Women's Volleyball Championship was held March 11–13, 2016, in Brandon, Manitoba, to determine a national champion for the 2015–16 CIS women's volleyball season. The tournament was played at the Healthy Living Centre and hosted by Brandon University. It was the first time that Brandon had hosted the tournament and coincided with the 10th anniversary of the Brandon Bobcats volleyball program.

The OUA Champion Toronto Varsity Blues completed a perfect 25–0 season by defeating the defending champion Trinity Western Spartans in the gold medal match 3–0 to claim the first women's volleyball national championship in program history. The Varsity Blues were the first team with an undefeated record over the course of the regular season and post-season since the 2010 UBC Thunderbirds. They were also the first OUA team to win the championship since the 1976 Western Mustangs and just the second OUA program to claim a national championship title.

== Participating teams ==
Seed	Team	Qualified	Record	Last	Total
1	Trinity Western Spartans	Canada West Champion	20–4	2015	1
2	Toronto Varsity Blues	OUA Champion	19–0	None	0
3	UBC Okanagan Heat	Canada West Finalist	22–2	None	0
4	Montreal Carabins	RSEQ Champion	17–5	None	0
5	UBC Thunderbirds	Canada West Bronze	17–7	2013	10
6	Dalhousie Tigers	AUS Champion	14–3	1982	1
7	McGill Martlets	RSEQ Finalist	15–7	None	0
8	Brandon Bobcats	Canada West Quarterfinalist (Host)	15–9	None	0

== Championship bracket ==
First Round: March 11
1	Trinity Western Spartans	3
8	Brandon Bobcats	1
4	Montreal Carabins	1
5	UBC Thunderbirds	3
2	Toronto Varsity Blues	3
7	McGill Martlets	2
3	UBC Okanagan Heat	3
6	Dalhousie Tigers	0

Semi-Finals: March 12
1	Trinity Western Spartans	3
5	UBC Thunderbirds	1
2	Toronto Varsity Blues	3
3	UBC Okanagan Heat	1

Gold Medal Game: March 13
1	Trinity Western Spartans	0
2	Toronto Varsity Blues	3
Bronze Medal Game: March 13
3	UBC Okanagan Heat	3
5	UBC Thunderbirds	0

== Consolation bracket ==
Semi-Finals: March 12
4	Montreal Carabins	3
8	Brandon Bobcats	0
6	Dalhousie Tigers	3
7	McGill Martlets	2

Fifth Place Game: March 13
4	Montreal Carabins	3
6	Dalhousie Tigers	0
