= John Barrett (volleyball) =

Canadian volleyball player and coach

Personal information
- Born: 11 August 1962 (age 64); Toronto, Ontario, Canada
- Education: University of Calgary; University of Manitoba

Coaching information
- Current team: Toronto Varsity Blues
Previous teams coached
Years	Teams
2006–2011; 2011–present	(Canada) Toronto Varsity Blues (AC) (Canada) Toronto Varsity Blues (HC)

National team
1984	Canada

John Barrett (born 11 August 1962) is the head coach for the Toronto Varsity Blues' men's volleyball team and is a former Canadian volleyball player. He played CIAU men's volleyball for the Calgary Dinosaurs before transferring to play for the Manitoba Bisons with whom he won a national championship while being named the tournament's most valuable player. He competed in the men's tournament at the 1984 Summer Olympics where the Canadian team finished in fourth place.

Barrett joined the Toronto Varsity Blues in 2006 as an assistant coach where he spent five years in that role. He was named the program's head coach on 19 September 2011.
