= UQAC Inuk =

Université du Québec à Chicoutimi athletic teams

- University: Université du Québec à Chicoutimi
- Association: U Sports
- Conference: RSEQ
- Location: Saguenay, Quebec
- Varsity teams: Four
- Arena: UQAC Arena
- Other venues: UQAC Sports Pavillon
- Colours: Green, Black, and White
- Website: www.uqac.ca/inuk/

The UQAC Inuk (French: Inuk de l’UQAC) are the athletic teams that represent the Université du Québec à Chicoutimi in Saguenay, Quebec, Canada. The university features teams in hockey, cross-country, track and field, and volleyball. UQAC became the 57th member of U Sports in 2023, having last competed in the league in 1986.

== History ==
The athletic program at UQAC began in 1970 with the formation of the men's hockey team. The team's moniker, Inuk, is an Inuit word for human being. The men's hockey team was a member of the CIAU until 1986 when it disbanded. On June 13, 2023, it was announced that UQAC had been accepted as the 57th member of U Sports on a two-year probation. The Inuk men's and women's cross country, men's track and field, and women's volleyball began competition in the 2023–24 season. The men's ice hockey team would be eligible to join in the 2025–26 season, pending the approval for full membership in June 2025.

== Varsity teams ==
Men's sports	Women's sports
Cross country	Cross country
Track and field	Volleyball

=== Men's hockey ===
The Inuk men's ice hockey team originally competed in the CIAU from 1976 to 1986 until the program was disbanded following the 1985–86 season. The program returned in 2022 after test matches were played in the previous year, led by head coach, Simon Gaudreault, where 12 exhibition games were scheduled. An RSEQ Division 2 was created for the 2023–24 season where the Inuk were inaugural members.

=== Women's volleyball ===
The Inuk women's volleyball program has been a member of the RSEQ Division 1 since the 2023–24 season. The team previously competed in the RSEQ Division 2 after it was established for the 2010–11 season. The team won RSEQ Division 2 championships in 2016 and 2022. The team is led by head coach Stéphane Gilbert.
