= U Sports women's volleyball championship =

Canadian university tournament

- Current season, competition or edition: 2026 U Sports Women's Volleyball Championship
- Sport: Indoor volleyball
- Founded: 1971; 55 years ago
- First season: 1971
- Organizing body: U Sports
- No. of teams: 8
- Country: Canada
- Most recent champion: Alberta Pandas (8th title)
- Most titles: UBC Thunderbirds (14)
- Website: usports.ca/en/sports/volleyball/f

The U Sports Women's Volleyball Championship is a Canadian university volleyball tournament conducted by U Sports, and determines the women's national champion. The tournament involves the champions from each of Canada's four regional sports conferences. The championship trophy, first awarded in 1977, features a two-wheeled oxcart, symbolizing the pioneer era on the Red River in Manitoba. The 2026 champions are the Alberta Pandas and the UBC Thunderbirds have won the most championships with a total of 14, including six in a row from 2008 to 2013.

== History ==
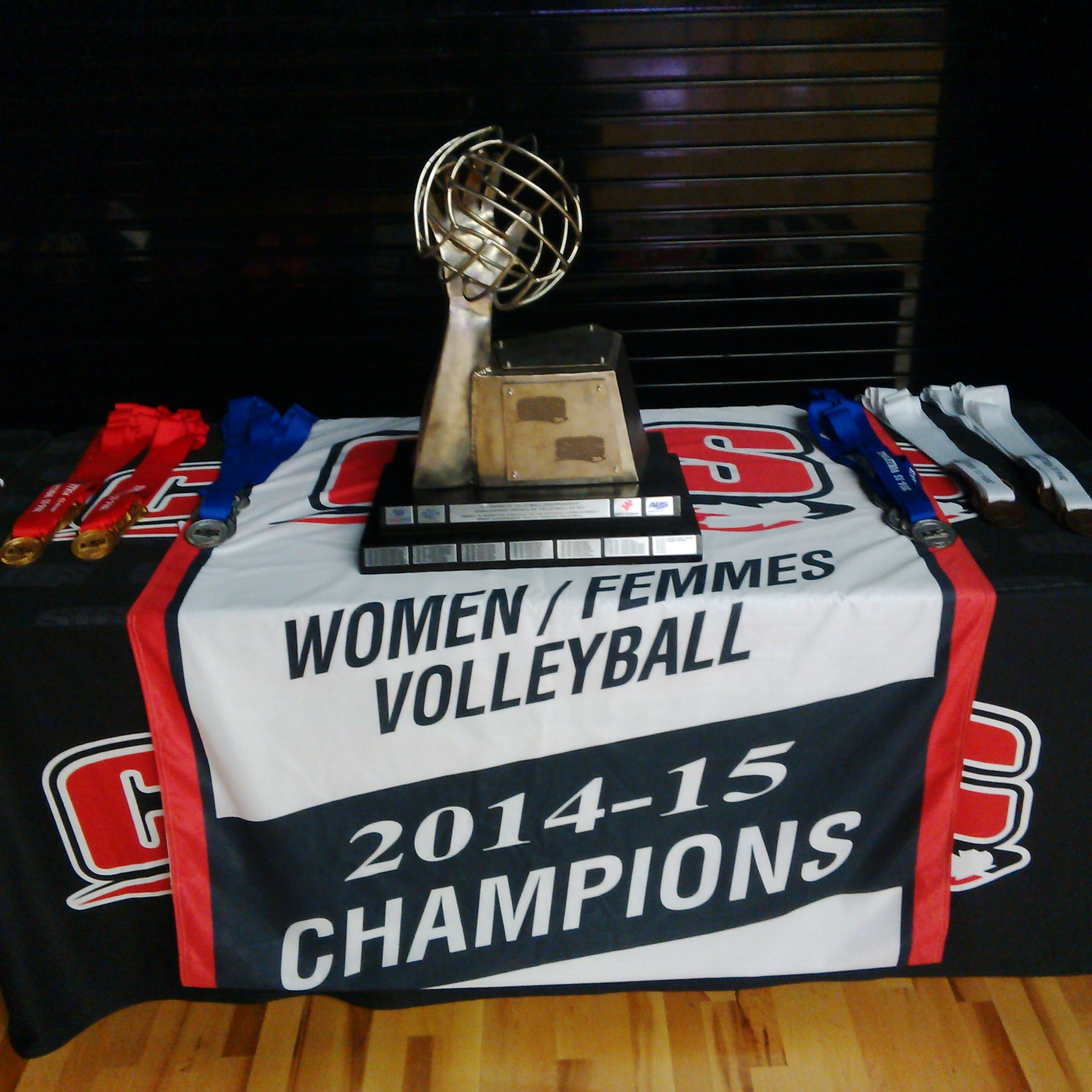
The championship trophy awarded to the gold medalists of the tournament.

While intercollegiate volleyball had been played in Canada since 1947, championships had been played for conference titles only. In 1969, the Canadian Women's Interuniversity Athletic Union (CWIAU) was formed (a precursor to today's U Sports organization) to provide a regulatory body for national competition. For the 1969–1970 season, the Calgary Dinos were named the first unofficial champions. The first official champions were the Manitoba Bisonettes, who were crowned following the 1970–1971 season after they defeated the Toronto Varsity Blues in four sets. While full historical championship results are not readily available, the championship was initially a round-robin tournament where the teams with the best records would then play for the championship. This was changed for the 1983 championship when the tournament changed to single-elimination. The 2020 and 2021 championship tournaments were cancelled due to the COVID-19 pandemic.

== Format ==
The championship currently consists of an eight-team tournament, with champions from each of the four conferences, one host, an additional OUA team, and two additional Canada West teams. While the berths for the conference champions and host remain consistent year-to-year, the other three invitees can change based on the host's conference and the competitive landscape in U Sports. The championship takes place over three days and features 11 games, with teams seeded 1–8. Teams are ranked by a committee as well as by the ELO ranking used to determine weekly Top 10 rankings nationally. Conference champions can be ranked no lower than 6th place. The team ranked 1st plays the 8th ranked team, 2nd plays 7th, 3rd plays 6th, and 4th plays 5th in the quarter-finals. To ensure common rest times, teams are not re-seeded after the first round, so the winner of 1v8 plays the winner of 4v5 and the winner of 2v7 plays the winner of 3v6. There is also a consolation bracket to determine the third-place winner (bronze medalist) and fifth-place winner. The gold medal game is the last game played in the tournament.

== Results ==
=== Round Robin Format (1971–1982) ===
Year	Host (City)	Championship final			Teams
Year	Host (City)	Champions	Score	Runners-up	Teams
1971	Calgary (Calgary, AB)	Manitoba Bisonettes	3–1	Toronto Varsity Blues	4
1972	Laurentian (Sudbury, ON)	Western Ontario Mustangs	3–1	Dalhousie Tigers	N/A
1973	Acadia (Wolfville, NS)	UBC Thunderettes	3–1	Western Ontario Mustangs	N/A
1974	British Columbia (Vancouver, BC)	UBC Thunderettes (2)	3–2	Western Ontario Mustangs (2)	5
1975	Laval (Quebec City, QC)	Western Ontario Mustangs (2)	3–0	Saskatchewan Huskiettes	N/A
1976	Manitoba/Winnipeg (Winnipeg, MB)	Western Ontario Mustangs (3)	3–1	UBC Thunderettes	5
1977	Waterloo (Waterloo, ON)	UBC Thunderettes (3)	3–0	Western Ontario Mustangs (3)	5
1978	Moncton (Moncton, NB)	UBC Thunderettes (4)	3–1	Western Ontario Mustangs (4)	6
1979	McMaster (Hamilton, ON)	Saskatchewan Huskiettes	3–1	York Yeowomen	N/A
1980	Saskatchewan (Saskatoon, SK)	Saskatchewan Huskiettes (2)	3–1	Ottawa Gee-Gees	6
1981	Victoria (Victoria, BC)	Saskatchewan Huskiettes (3)	3–1	Manitoba Bisons	6
1982	Dalhousie (Halifax, NS)	Dalhousie Tigers	3–2	Calgary Dinosaurs	6

=== Single Elimination Format (1983–present) ===
Year	Host (City)	Gold medal match			Bronze medal match			Teams
Year	Host (City)	Gold medalists	Score	Silver medalists	Bronze medalists	Score	4th place	Teams
1983	British Columbia (Vancouver, BC)	Winnipeg Wesmen	3–0	Calgary Dinosaurs (2)	UBC Thunderbirds	3–2	Laval Rouge et Or	8
1984	Laval (Quebec City, QC)	Winnipeg Wesmen (2)	3–2	Dalhousie Tigers (2)	York Yeowomen	3–2	Laval Rouge et Or	8
1985	York (North York, ON)	Winnipeg Wesmen (3)	3–1	Calgary Dinosaurs (3)	York Yeowomen (2)	3–2	Saskatchewan Huskiettes	8
1986	Moncton (Moncton, NB)	Winnipeg Wesmen (4)	3–2	Manitoba Bisons (2)	Sherbrooke Vert et Or	3–0	Laval Rouge et Or	8
1987	Winnipeg (Winnipeg, MB)	Winnipeg Wesmen (5)	3–0	Manitoba Bisons (3)	Laval Rouge et Or	3–1	Victoria Vikettes	8
1988	Sherbrooke (Sherbrooke, QC)	Winnipeg Wesmen (6)	3–0	Sherbrooke Vert et Or	Laval Rouge et Or (2)	3–1	Calgary Dinosaurs	8
1989	Saskatchewan (Saskatoon, SK)	Calgary Dinosaurs	3–0	Victoria Vikettes	Laval Rouge et Or (3)	3–2	Winnipeg Wesmen	8
1990	Windsor (Windsor, ON)	Manitoba Bisons (2)	3–2	Victoria Vikettes (2)	York Yeowomen (3)	3–2	Regina Cougars	8
1991	Calgary (Calgary, AB)	Manitoba Bisons (3)	3–1	Saskatchewan Huskies (2)	York Yeowomen (4)	3–2	Winnipeg Wesmen (2)	8
1992	York (North York, ON)	Manitoba Bisons (4)	3–1	Winnipeg Wesmen	Calgary Dinosaurs	3–1	York Yeowomen	8
1993	Laval (Quebec City, QC)	Winnipeg Wesmen (7)	3–0	Alberta Pandas	Manitoba Bisons	3–1	Calgary Dinosaurs (2)	8
1994	Winnipeg (Winnipeg, MB)	Calgary Dinosaurs (2)	3–0	Winnipeg Wesmen (2)	Manitoba Bisons (2)	3–1	Montréal Carabins	8
1995	Alberta (Edmonton, AB)	Alberta Pandas	3–1	Laval Rouge et Or	Manitoba Bisons (3)	3–1	Winnipeg Wesmen	8
1996	Toronto (Toronto, ON)	Alberta Pandas (2)	3–1	Laval Rouge et Or (2)	UBC Thunderbirds (2)	3–1	Winnipeg Wesmen	8
1997	Alberta (Edmonton, AB)	Alberta Pandas (3)	3–2	UBC Thunderbirds (2)	Laval Rouge et Or (4)	3–0	Manitoba Bisons	8
1998	Alberta (Edmonton, AB)	Alberta Pandas (4)	3–1	Manitoba Bisons (4)	Laval Rouge et Or (5)	3–2	UBC Thunderbirds	8
1999	Alberta (Edmonton, AB)	Alberta Pandas (5)	3–1	UBC Thunderbirds (3)	Manitoba Bisons (4)	3–0	Laval Rouge et Or	8
2000	Winnipeg (Winnipeg, MB)	Alberta Pandas (6)	3–2	Manitoba Bisons (5)	UBC Thunderbirds (3)	3–1	Montréal Carabins	8
2001	Manitoba (Winnipeg, MB)	Manitoba Bisons (5)	3–1	Sherbrooke Vert et Or (2)	Laval Rouge et Or (6)	3–0	Toronto Varsity Blues	8
2002	Laval (Quebec City, QC)	Manitoba Bisons (6)	3–1	Calgary Dinos (4)	UBC Thunderbirds (4)	3–0	Sherbrooke Vert et Or	8
2003	Laval (Quebec City, QC)	Sherbrooke Vert et Or	3–1	Winnipeg Wesmen (3)	Alberta Pandas	3–1	Calgary Dinos	8
2004	Saskatchewan (Saskatoon, SK)	Calgary Dinos (3)	3–1	Alberta Pandas (2)	Laval Rouge et Or (7)	3–0	UBC Thunderbirds	8
2005	Saskatchewan (Saskatoon, SK)	Sherbrooke Vert et Or (2)	3–0	UBC Thunderbirds (4)	Calgary Dinos (2)	3–1	Alberta Pandas	8
2006; Details	Calgary (Calgary, AB)	Laval Rouge et Or	3–1	UBC Thunderbirds (5)	Calgary Dinos (3)	3–2	Montréal Carabins	8
2007; Details	Calgary (Calgary, AB)	Alberta Pandas (7)	3–1	Laval Rouge et Or (3)	Calgary Dinos (4)	3–0	Trinity Western Spartans	8
2008; Details	New Brunswick (Fredericton, NB)	UBC Thunderbirds (5)	3–2	Montreal Carabins	Calgary Dinos (5)	3–2	Alberta Pandas	8
2009; Details	New Brunswick (Fredericton, NB)	UBC Thunderbirds (6)	3–2	Calgary Dinos (5)	Montréal Carabins	3–2	Laval Rouge et Or	8
2010; Details	Alberta (Edmonton, AB)	UBC Thunderbirds (7)	3–1	Manitoba Bisons (6)	Laval Rouge et Or (8)	3–1	Alberta Pandas	8
2011; Details	Laval (Quebec City, QC)	UBC Thunderbirds (8)	3–0	Laval Rouge et Or (4)	Trinity Western Spartans	3–1	Alberta Pandas	8
2012; Details	McMaster (Hamilton, ON)	UBC Thunderbirds (9)	3–2	Alberta Pandas (3)	McGill Martlets	3–1	Montréal Carabins	8
2013; Details	Sherbrooke (Sherbrooke, QC)	UBC Thunderbirds (10)	3–0	Alberta Pandas (4)	Trinity Western Spartans (2)	3–0	Ottawa Gee-Gees	8
2014; Details	Regina (Regina, SK)	Manitoba Bisons (7)	3–0	UBC Thunderbirds (6)	Laval Rouge et Or (9)	3–1	Dalhousie Tigers	8
2015; Details	Toronto (Toronto, ON)	Trinity Western Spartans	3–2	Alberta Pandas (5)	Montréal Carabins (2)	3–2	Toronto Varsity Blues	8
2016; Details	Brandon (Brandon, MB)	Toronto Varsity Blues	3–0	Trinity Western Spartans	UBC Okanagan Heat	3–0	UBC Thunderbirds	8
2017; Details	Ryerson (Toronto, ON)	UBC Thunderbirds (11)	3–1	Alberta Pandas (6)	Trinity Western Spartans (3)	3–2	Montréal Carabins	8
2018; Details	Laval (Quebec City, QC)	Ryerson Rams	3–1	Alberta Pandas (7)	UBC Thunderbirds (5)	3–1	Calgary Dinos	8
2019; Details	Alberta (Edmonton, AB)	UBC Thunderbirds (12)	3–2	Ryerson Rams	Alberta Pandas (2)	3–2	Dalhousie Tigers	8
2020; Details	Calgary (Calgary, AB)	Cancelled due to the COVID-19 pandemic			Cancelled due to the COVID-19 pandemic			8
2021; Details	British Columbia (Vancouver, BC)	Cancelled due to the COVID-19 pandemic			Cancelled due to the COVID-19 pandemic			8
2022; Details	Calgary (Calgary, AB)	Trinity Western Spartans (2)	3–1	Mount Royal Cougars	Alberta Pandas (3)	3–0	McGill Martlets	8
2023; Details	British Columbia (Vancouver, BC)	UBC Thunderbirds (13)	3–2	Trinity Western Spartans (2)	Dalhousie Tigers	3–2	Manitoba Bisons	8
2024; Details	McMaster (Hamilton, ON)	UBC Thunderbirds (14)	3–1	Alberta Pandas (8)	Manitoba Bisons (5)	3–0	Acadia Axewomen	8
2025; Details	Manitoba (Winnipeg, MB)	Manitoba Bisons (8)	3–1	Montréal Carabins (2)	Alberta Pandas (4)	3–1	UBC Thunderbirds	8
2026; Details	Trinity Western (Langley, BC)	Alberta Pandas (8)	3–0	Sherbrooke Vert et Or (3)	Brock Badgers	3–2	Trinity Western Spartans	8
2027; Details	Toronto (Toronto, ON)							8
2028; Details	Mount Royal (Calgary, AB)							8

== Results by schools ==
The following table includes all known first, second, and third-place finishes, as indicated above. Prior to 1983, there were no third-place finishes, and the second-place finish was the loser of the championship game.

Team	Conference	1st	2nd	3rd	Last
UBC Thunderbirds	Canada West	14	6	5	2024
Manitoba Bisons	Canada West	8	6	5	2025
Alberta Pandas	Canada West	8	8	4	2026
Winnipeg Wesmen	Canada West	7	3	0	1993
Calgary Dinos	Canada West	3	5	5	2004
Western Ontario Mustangs	OUA	3	4	0	1976
Saskatchewan Huskies	Canada West	3	2	0	1981
Sherbrooke Vert et Or	RSEQ	2	3	1	2005
Trinity Western Spartans	Canada West	2	2	3	2022
Laval Rouge et Or	RSEQ	1	4	9	2006
Dalhousie Tigers	AUS	1	2	1	1982
Toronto Varsity Blues	OUA	1	1	0	2016
Ryerson Rams	OUA	1	1	0	2018
Victoria Vikes/Vikettes	Canada West	0	2	0	None
York Lions/Yeowomen	OUA	0	1	4	None
Montreal Carabins	RSEQ	0	2	2	None
Ottawa Gee-Gees	OUA	0	1	0	None
Mount Royal Cougars	Canada West	0	1	0	None
McGill Martlets	RSEQ	0	0	1	None
UBC Okanagan Heat	Canada West	0	0	1	None
Brock Badgers	OUA	0	0	1	None

== See also ==
- NCAA Division I women's volleyball tournament
