= Stephen Heppell =

British educationalist, writer and speaker

Stephen Heppell is a British educationalist, writer and speaker. He held professorships at Anglia Ruskin University and Bournemouth University, and he currently holds the Filipe Segovia Chair of Learning Innovation at Universidad Camilo Jose Cela in Madrid. He was an advisor to the British Government's Department for Education co-authoring 'The Stephenson Report' and chaired their Education Technology Advisory Group.

== Early life ==
Stephen John Heppell grew up in Little Chalfont and attended Dr Challoner's Grammar School before studying psychology and economics at Reading University. After a brief career in accounting, he received a doctorate of education from University of East London, and a masters in social investing at South Bank University.

== Early career ==
Heppell first taught at Leytonstone Boys' School in East London where he taught social sciences before moving to Fryerns School in Basildon. Heppell joined Anglia Ruskin University from the Microelectronics Education Programme and was appointed the professor in 1989. He held the chair of New Learning Environments until 2004, and where he established and led their Ultralab learning technology research centre. Heppell was appointed to Bournemouth University's chair in New Media Environments at the Centre for Excellence in Media Practice between 2008 and 2017.

Heppell joined Universidad Camilo Jose Cela in 2011, and in 2018, he oversaw the development of experimental learning spaces using many of the design principles he advocates. These include the use of zoning and agile furniture, carefully monitoring interior conditions such as temperature, light levels, CO_{2} saturation, noise, and the degree of visibility through the space. Heppell is also known for advocating 'shoeless learning' to promote comfort and calmness in learning spaces.

== Other professional interests ==
Heppell ceased teaching in 2010, but still provides consultancy services via his company, heppell.net which he established in 2005. The company advises governments, international agencies, companies (including Gems Education and Educurious), schools and communities to, in his words, "make learning better." Heppell was a founding member of Teachers TV and has been a board member of Skillset and Digital Jersey as well as being executive chairman of Learning Possibilities. He is a member of BAFTA and chaired its Technical Innovation Jury and sat as a council member between 2009 and 2016 as well as sitting on its film committee.

== Awards ==
- 2005 The Royal Television Society's Judges Award for Lifelong Services to Educational Broadcasting
- 2008 BETT Award for Outstanding Achievement in ICT Education
- 2014 NAACE Lifetime Achievement Award for educational technology.

== Personal life ==
He is married to teacher Carole Chapman and he has three children.
