= Brittany Dawn Eva Habing =

Canadian volleyball player (born 1992)

Personal information
- Nationality: Canadian
- Born: 1 May 1992 (age 34); East St. Paul, Manitoba
- Height: 170 cm (67 in)
- Spike: 295 cm (116 in)
- Block: 290 cm (114 in)

Volleyball information
- Position: Setter
- Number: 14 (national team)

Career
| Years | Teams |
|---|---|
| 2015 | University of Manitoba |

National team
| 2015 | Canada |

Brittany Dawn Eva Habing (born 1 May 1992) is a Canadian female volleyball player. She is part of the Canada women's national volleyball team.

She participated in the 2015 FIVB Volleyball World Grand Prix. On club level she played for University of Manitoba in 2015.
