= UBC Okanagan Heat =

University of British Columbia Okanagan sports teams

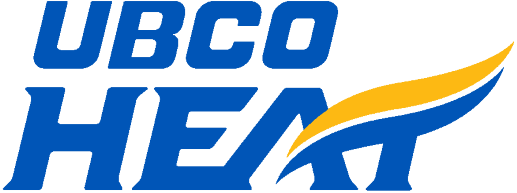
- University: University of British Columbia (Okanagan)
- Nickname: Heat
- Association: U Sports
- Conference: Canada West
- Athletic director: Tom Huisman
- Location: Kelowna, British Columbia
- Varsity teams: 12 (6 men's, 6 women's)
- Basketball arena: UBC Okanagan Gymnasium
- Soccer stadium: Nonis Sports Field
- Volleyball arena: UBC Okanagan Gymnasium
- Colours: Blue and gold
- Mascot: Scorch
- Website: goheat.ca

The UBC Okanagan Heat are the athletic teams that represent the Okanagan campus of the University of British Columbia (UBC) in Kelowna, British Columbia and currently compete in the Canada West conference of U Sports. The Heat field varsity teams in basketball, cross country, golf, soccer, softball, rugby, and volleyball.

== History ==
The Heat received a probationary membership in Canada West in 2010 and had both the men's and women's volleyball and basketball teams begin competing there in the 2011–12 season. The program was granted full membership in 2013 and the men's and women's soccer programs began competing in the 2014–15 season. Since joining Canada West, the women's volleyball team of the Heat has been the most successful, qualifying for the playoffs six times and earning two appearances in the U Sports national tournament.

== Varsity sports ==
Men's sports	Women's sports
Basketball	Basketball
Cross country	Cross country
Golf	Golf
Soccer	Soccer
Track and field	Track and field
Volleyball	Volleyball

=== Men's basketball ===
The UBCO men's basketball team won their first men's basketball conference game on November 25, 2011, when they defeated the Regina Cougars 78–76 during their inaugural 2011–12 Canada West season. As of the 2023 season, the Heat have yet to qualify for a spot in a Canada West or U Sports post season.

=== Women's basketball ===
The UBCO women's basketball team first began play in Canada West in the 2011–12 season and finished outside of the playoffs with a 2–16 record. The team has not yet qualified for the Canada West playoffs as of the 2019–20 season.

=== Women's Cross Country/Track ===
The UBCO women's cross country team placed second as a team at the Canada West championships in 2021. Individually, Joanna Brown and Lauren McNeil took 1st and 2nd place, respectively. McNeil went on to earn silver at the USPORTS Championships, while the team finished 8th. In the 2022 season, the women's team repeated as silver medalists with Joanna Brown leading the team by placing 2nd individually. At the USPORTS championships, the team recorded their best ever finish, fighting bad weather to place 5th in the country with Joanna Brown placing 8th overall.

=== Men's volleyball ===
The UBCO men's volleyball team made the post-season in their first season in Canada West during the 2011–12 season and were the only Heat team to qualify for the playoffs in that inaugural year. That stood as the only year that the team had qualified for the playoffs in Canada West up until the 2021–22 season.

=== Women's volleyball ===
The UBCO women's volleyball team first began competing in Canada West in the 2011–12 season and finished out of the playoffs with a 6–14 record. However, the team rapidly improved the following year where they finished with a 15–7 record and a third place conference finish where they lost to the Mount Royal Cougars in their first Canada West playoff appearance. While the team regressed to a 12–10 record and a seventh-place finish in the 2013–14 season, the Heat claimed their first post-season series victory against the Brandon Bobcats before ultimately losing the Canada West Bronze Medal match to the Trinity Western Spartans. The team finished third in the regular season in 2014–15, but once again fell short in the playoffs, losing the bronze medal game to the UBC Thunderbirds.

For the 2015–16 season, the Heat finished in first place in the Canada West conference regular season with a 22–2 record and subsequently hosted the Canada West Final Four. After defeating the Thunderbirds in the semi-final, the Heat lost a five-set match to the Spartans in the Canada West Championship game. However, because the Heat finished in the top three in the Canada West playoffs, the team qualified for their first U Sports women's volleyball championship tournament and were the third-seeded team. After defeating the Dalhousie Tigers in the quarter-finals, the Heat lost in the Semi-Finals to the eventual champion Toronto Varsity Blues. However, in the bronze medal match, the Heat once again defeated the UBC Thunderbirds to claim third place in their first ever appearance in the CIS national tournament.

The Heat finished with a 15–9 record and a fifth-place finish for the 2016–17 season but lost the Bronze Medal match in the Canada West playoffs to the Trinity Western Spartans. In 2017–18, the team finished in third place with a 19–5 record but lost in the Canada West semi-finals to the Thunderbirds. However, since the 2017 national championship tournament qualified four Canada West teams, no bronze medal game was played and the Heat automatically qualified for the eight-team tournament. However, the fifth-seeded Heat lost to the fourth-seeded, and eventual champion, Ryerson Rams after giving up a 2–0 set lead.

The 2018–19 season saw the Heat tumble down the standings with a 2–22 last-place finish and an absence from the playoffs for the first time since their inaugural season in Canada West. The following 2019–20 season was an improvement with a 7–17 finish, but the team still finished in tenth place and out of the playoffs.

== Club sports ==
=== Men's rugby ===
The Heat men's rugby team, established in 2011, is a competitive club rugby team based in the Prairie region. Coached by Dan Haynes, they compete in the Prairie League. In the 2022 and 2023 seasons, the Heat Men's Rugby Team showcased their prowess on the field by achieving an impressive record of 4–0 in both seasons. This undefeated streak highlighted their dominance in the league during these years. However, despite their strong performances, the Heat faced challenges from the Calgary Dinos, to whom they lost twice in the league finals during these seasons. These matches against the Calgary Dinos were highly anticipated and demonstrated the competitive spirit and high level of play within the Prairie League.

The Heat have competed multiple times in the McTavish Cup, the men's rugby national championship, seeing limited success. Their campaigns in 2024 and 2025 saw lopsided defeats to UBC 104-0 and Guelph 59-0.

Two of the alumni, Kyle Tremblay and Rhys James were selected to play for Pacific Pride starting in 2023 and were selected as Canada Selects in 2024. In the 2024 season, the Heat won their first Prairie League championship, defeating the University of Alberta by a score of 12–5.

== Awards and honors ==
=== Outstanding Athletes of the Year ===
Year	Female athlete	Sport	Male athlete	Sport	Ref.
2019–20	Natalie Livingston	Volleyball	Hamish Walde	Soccer	
2021–22	Lauren McNeil	Cross Country	Nicholas Reitsma	Soccer	
2022–23	Sydney Grills	Volleyball	Justin Towill	Golf	
2023–24	Jaeli Ibbetson	Basketball	Justin Towill	Golf	

== See also ==
- UBC Thunderbirds
