= Goldring Centre for High Performance Sport =

Athletic facility on the University of Toronto St. George campus

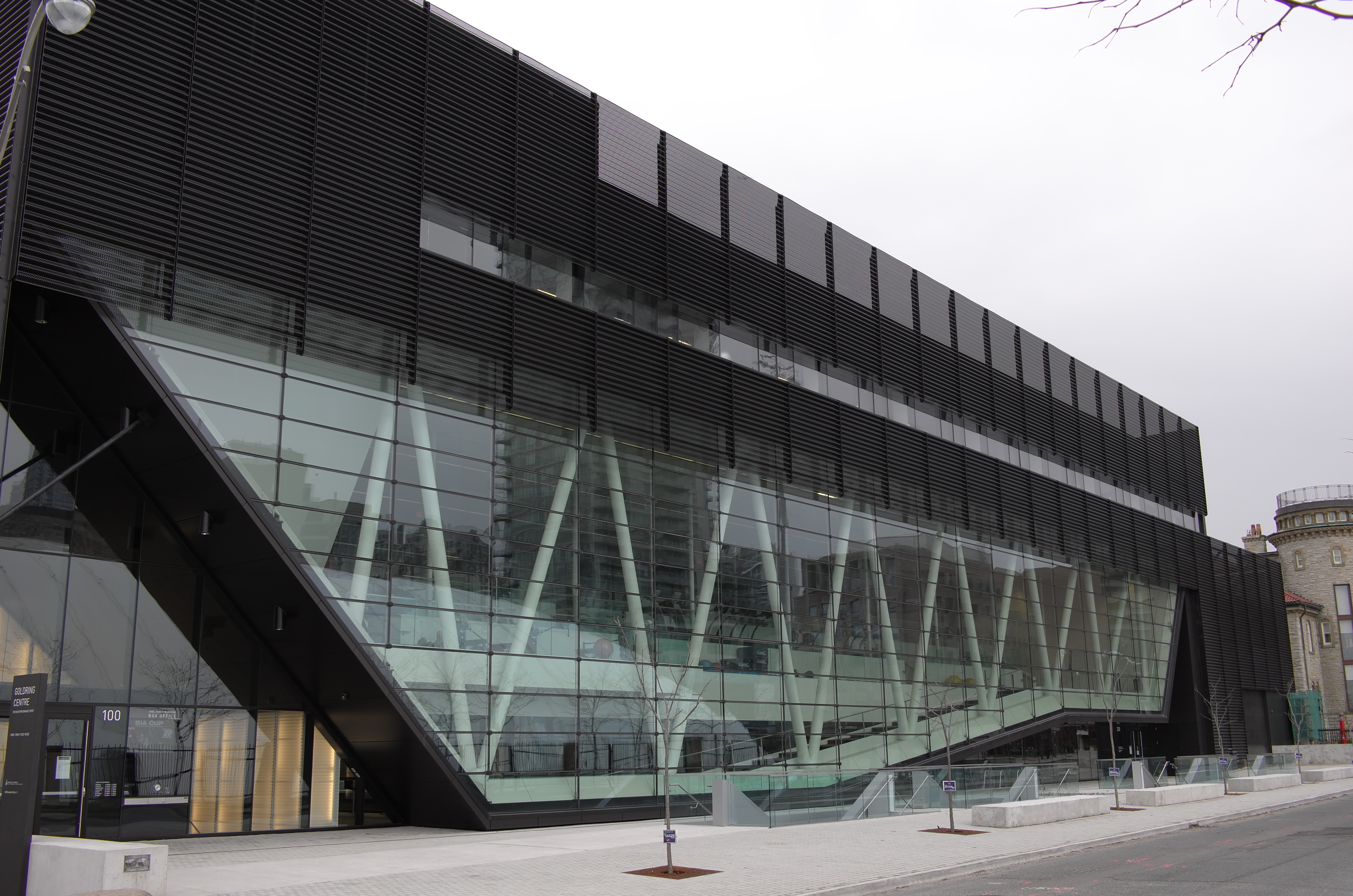
- Interactive map of Goldring Centre for High Performance Sport
- Address: 100 Devonshire Place, Toronto, Ontario, Canada
- Location: University of Toronto St. George
- Coordinates: 43°40′01″N 79°23′54″W
- Owner: University of Toronto
- Capacity: 2,000
- Public transit: at St. George

Construction
- Groundbreaking: April 2012
- Opened: November 2014

Tenants
- Toronto Varsity Blues (U Sports); Toronto Tempo (WNBA) (practise)

The Goldring Centre for High Performance Sport is a 2,000 seat indoor arena facility of the University of Toronto on its St. George campus in Toronto, Ontario, Canada. It is home to the university's Varsity Blues basketball and volleyball teams.

The facility was completed in the fall of 2014 at a cost $58 million, with $22.5 million coming from the Ontario Ministry of Training, Colleges and Universities and $11 million from the Goldring family, for whom the centre has been named. The facility was designed by Patkau Architects and MacLennan Jaunkalns Miller Architects in a joint venture, with landscape architecture by PLANT Architect, structural engineering by Blackwell, and construction services by EllisDon.

Along with the 2,000-seat, internationally rated field house for basketball, volleyball and other court sports, the multi-storey sport and exercise facility houses a state-of-the-art strength and conditioning centre, fitness studio and sports medicine clinic, along with research and teaching laboratories.

The venue is also home to the BioSteel All-Canadian Basketball Game, an annual all-star game that features the best Canadian high school basketball players of the year.

Since April 2026, the Goldring Centre has been the practise facility for the Toronto Tempo professional basketball team in the interim while a purpose-built training facility is constructed.

== See also ==
- List of University of Toronto buildings
