= U Sports =

Governing body of university sport in Canada

- Formation: 1961; 65 years ago
- Legal status: Association
- Headquarters: Richmond Hill, Ontario
- Region served: Canada
- Members: 58 schools
- CEO: Pierre Arsenault
- Main organ: Executive Committee
- Website: usports.ca

U Sports (stylized as U SPORTS) is the national sport governing body for universities in Canada, comprising the majority of degree-granting universities in the country and four regional conferences: Ontario University Athletics (OUA), Réseau du sport étudiant du Québec (RSEQ), Canada West (CW), and Atlantic University Sport (AUS). The equivalent body for organized sports at colleges in Canada is the Canadian Collegiate Athletic Association (CCAA). Some institutions are members of both bodies for different sports.

== History ==
=== Early development (1900s–1961) ===
University sport in Canada emerged during the early 20th century through a collection of regional intercollegiate associations. These bodies organized competition in sports such as football, hockey, basketball, and track and field, but there was no single national authority responsible for governance, eligibility standards, or national championships. Regional conferences operated independently, and coordination at the national level remained limited until the early 1960s.

With the collapse of the CIAU Central in the mid-1950s, calls for a new, national governing body for university sport accelerated. Once the Royal Military College of Canada became a degree granting institution, Major W. J. (Danny) McLeod, athletic director at the RMC directed the establishment of the Canadian Intercollegiate Athletic Union (CIAU) in 1961.

=== Formation of the CIAU (1961) ===
A national framework for university athletics was established in 1961 with the creation of the Canadian Interuniversity Athletic Union (CIAU). The CIAU aimed to unify university sport across the country by providing standardized eligibility rules, coordinating national championships, and offering a consistent administrative structure. Through the 1970s and 1980s, the organization expanded its championship offerings and formally incorporated a growing number of women’s sports, reflecting broader developments in Canadian and international athletics.

From 1965 to 1967, former McMaster University athletic director Ivor Wynne was the CIAU president. In 1966, he chaired a committee studying whether to allow athletic scholarships in the CIAU, for discussion at the 1967 general meeting. The CIAU decided that scholarships should not be given out solely based on athletic merits, upholding that scholarships were based on academic merits. The CIAU also felt that students who accepted National Collegiate Athletic Association scholarships in the United States, would not have qualified for academic standards at Canadian universities. In 1968, Wynne helped propose a Prairie Bowl in Western Canada as part of a national playdown for the CIAU College Bowl.

=== Transition to CIS (2001) ===
In 2001, the CIAU rebranded as Canadian Interuniversity Sport (CIS). The change was intended to modernize its identity and improve visibility. During the CIS era, the governing body emphasized more formalized governance practices, expanded commercial and media partnerships, and increased broadcasting of national events. Flagship championships such as the Vanier Cup benefited from greater national exposure during this period.

=== Rebranding as U Sports (2016–present) ===
In October 2016, CIS rebranded as U Sports, to appeal to a broader audience and simplify branding. Since the rebranding, U Sports has prioritized digital media growth, unified championship branding, and enhanced support for athlete recruitment, academic standards, mental health, and gender equity initiatives. The organization today oversees more than twenty national championships across four regional conferences—Canada West, Ontario University Athletics (OUA), the Réseau du sport étudiant du Québec (RSEQ), and Atlantic University Sport (AUS)—representing over fifty universities and thousands of student-athletes across Canada.

== Athletic funding and eligibility ==
The U Sports member institutions offer athletic scholarships known as Athletic Financial Awards (AFA); subject to minimum academic requirements. The AFA's are capped and may not exceed the value of the tuition and compulsory fees for the student-athlete. Universities also may provide additional non-athletic awards including academic scholarships and needs-based grants for athletes in addition to this cap, provided the additional awards do not include athletic criteria. In 2008–09 one in two U Sports athletes was receiving an athletic scholarship.

Increasingly, U Sports schools are offering booster-support programs, where alumni, parents and/or corporations can donate money to a targeted fund especially designed to off-set a student-athlete's tuition and living costs. The University of Windsor has an Adopt-A-Lancer program, for example. U Sports has no regulations regarding how much each school can provide to teams through private support. The Université Laval's Rouge et Or football team, winner of seven of the last 12 Vanier Cups, is so successful with fund raising that the team trains in Florida during the spring.

Canadian Hockey League teams offer financial support for their graduates – who attend school within two years of playing major junior – who choose to play for a U Sports school after graduating from major junior hockey based on a model where the league will give scholarships commensurate with the seasons they played in the CHL.

Beginning with the 2024–25 season, students could receive athletic scholarships regardless of the grades they received in their final year of high school or CEGEP. U Sports institutions also became required to give at least 45% of their athletic scholarship units to both athletes on men's teams and athletes on women's teams.

== Sponsored sports ==
U Sports currently awards 23 national championship sports. Sports sanctioned include the following: basketball, cross country, curling, fencing, field hockey (women), football (men), golf, ice hockey, rugby union (women), soccer, swimming, track and field, volleyball, and wrestling. Tennis became the first Pilot Sport in U Sports history, commencing play in 2024 and operating in partnership with Tennis Canada. In the 2027–28 season, women's flag football will be added as a Pilot Sport and bring the total number of national championships awarded to 24.

=== Men's team sports ===
No.	Sport	Founded	Teams	Season	Most championships
1	Basketball	1962	48	Fall	Carleton (18)
2	Curling	2008	16	Fall	Wilfrid Laurier (4)
3	Football	1961	27	Winter	Laval (12)
4	Ice hockey	1961	35	Winter	Alberta (16)
5	Soccer	1972	48	Fall	UBC (14)
6	Tennis	2014	N/A	Winter	Montreal, UBC (3)
7	Volleyball	1966	31	Winter	Manitoba, Winnipeg, Alberta (10)

=== Men's individual sports ===
No.	Sport	Founded	Teams	Season
1	Cross country	1963	34	Fall
2	Swimming	1965	INC	Winter
3	Track & field	1981	31	Winter
4	Wrestling	1969	15	Winter

=== Women's team sports ===
No.	Sport	Founded	Teams	Season	Most championships
1	Basketball	1977	48	Fall	Victoria (9)
2	Curling	2008	16	Fall	Alberta (5)
3	Field hockey	1975	10	Fall	UBC (19)
4	Flag football	2027	TBA	Spring	
5	Ice hockey	1997	35	Winter	Alberta (8)
6	Rugby union	1998	26	Fall	Alberta, St. Francis Xavier (6)
7	Soccer	1987	52	Fall	UBC (7)
8	Tennis	2014	N/A	Winter	Alberta (6)
9	Volleyball	1969	43	Winter	UBC (13)

=== Women's individual sports ===
No.	Sport	Founded	Teams	Season
1	Cross country	1988	34	Fall
2	Swimming	1971	INC	Winter
3	Track & field	1981	31	Winter
4	Wrestling	1999	15	Winter

== National championships ==
U Sports hosts national championships for the following sports:

U Sports
Sport	Men	Women
Basketball	1963–	1987–
Cross country	1963–	1988–
Curling	2008–	2008–
Field hockey		1975–
Football	1965–	
Ice hockey	1963–	1998–
Rugby union		1998–
Soccer	1972–	1987–
Swimming	1965–	1971–
Tennis	2014–	2014–
Track & field	1981–	1981–
Volleyball (indoor)	1967–	1971–
Wrestling	1969–	1999–

== Conferences and members ==
There are 58 member universities in U Sports. These 58 member universities are currently organized into the four following regional associations. In some of these sports, these associations are sometimes referred to as conferences. These conferences also organize regional championships.

- Atlantic University Sport (AUS)
- Canada West Universities Athletic Association (CW)
- Ontario University Athletics (OUA)
- Réseau du sport étudiant du Québec (RSEQ)

Institution	Nickname	City	Province	Founded	Affiliation	Enrollment	Endowment	Membership
Acadia University	Axemen (M), Axewomen (W)	Wolfville	NS	1838	Public non-denominational, formerly Baptist	4,650	$40M	AUS
Cape Breton University	Capers	Sydney	NS	2005	Public	3,500	$6.1M	AUS
Dalhousie University	Tigers	Halifax	NS	1818	Public	18,940	$478M	AUS
Memorial University of Newfoundland	Sea-Hawks	St. John's	NL	1925	Public	18,172	$93M	AUS
Mount Allison University	Mounties	Sackville	NB	1839	Public, United Church of Canada	2,260	$247M	AUS
Université de Moncton	Aigles Bleus (M), Aigles Bleues (W)	Moncton	NB	1864	Public, organized Roman Catholic	4,187	—	AUS
University of New Brunswick	Reds	Fredericton	NB	1785	Public	9,000	—	AUS
University of Prince Edward Island	Panthers	Charlottetown	PEI	1969	Public	4,000	—	AUS
Saint Mary's University	Huskies	Halifax	NS	1802	Public, Roman Catholic	7,040	$16.9M	AUS
St. Francis Xavier University	X-Men (M), X-Women (W)	Antigonish	NS	1853	Public, Roman Catholic	5,150	$59.4M	AUS
St. Thomas University	Tommies	Fredericton	NB	1910	Public	2,633	—	AUS
University of British Columbia	Thunderbirds	UBC Vancouver	BC	1908	Public	43,579	$1.16B	CW
Trinity Western University	Spartans	Langley	BC	1962	Private, Evangelical Christian	2,700	—	CW
University of Victoria	Vikes	Victoria	BC	1903	Public	19,500	$348M	CW
University of the Fraser Valley	Cascades	Abbotsford	BC	1974	Public	21,500	—	CW
University of Northern British Columbia	Timberwolves	Prince George	BC	1990	Public	4,183	—	CW
Thompson Rivers University	WolfPack	Kamloops	BC	1970	Public	13,072	—	CW
University of British Columbia Okanagan	Heat	Kelowna	BC	2005	Public	6,015	—	CW
University of Alberta	Golden Bears (M), Pandas (W)	Edmonton	AB	1908	Public	36,435	$1.0B	CW
University of Calgary	Dinos	Calgary	AB	1966	Public	28,196	$568M	CW
MacEwan University	Griffins	Edmonton	AB	1971	Public	13,889	—	CW
Mount Royal University	Cougars	Calgary	AB	1910	Public	14,175	—	CW
University of Saskatchewan	Huskies	Saskatoon	SK	1907	Public	19,082	$247M	CW
University of Lethbridge	Pronghorns	Lethbridge	AB	1967	Public	8,765	$24.5M	CW
Brandon University	Bobcats	Brandon	MB	1890	Public, formerly Baptist	3,383	—	CW
University of Regina	Rams (football), Cougars	Regina	SK	1911	Public, formerly Methodist	12,800	$25.9M	CW
University of Winnipeg	Wesmen	Winnipeg	MB	1871	Public, formerly Methodist	9,219	—	CW
University of Manitoba	Bisons	Winnipeg	MB	1877	Semi-public merger of three denominational colleges	27,599	$424M	CW
Carleton University	Ravens	Ottawa	ON	1942	Public	25,262	$190M	OUA
University of Ottawa	Gee-Gees	Ottawa	ON	1848	Public, formerly Roman Catholic	35,548	$201M	OUA
University of Toronto	Varsity Blues	Toronto	ON	1827	Public	56,383	$1.66B	OUA
Toronto Metropolitan University	Bold	Toronto	ON	1948	Public	24,000	$118M	OUA
Queen's University	Golden Gaels	Kingston	ON	1841	Public, formerly Presbyterian	20,566	$722M	OUA
York University	Lions	Toronto	ON	1959	Public	42,400	$373M	OUA
Laurentian University	Voyageurs	Sudbury	ON	1960	Public, formerly Roman Catholic, United Church of Canada and Anglican	7,758	$36M	OUA
Algoma University	Thunderbirds	Sault Ste. Marie	ON	1964	Public formerly non-denominational	1,427	—	OUA
Royal Military College of Canada	Paladins	Kingston	ON	1876	Federal	900	(Note: Federal ethics rules prohibit RMC from maintaining an endowment.)	OUA
Trent University	Excalibur	Peterborough	ON	1964	Public	7,160	$43M	OUA
Nipissing University	Lakers	North Bay	ON	1909	Public formerly non-denominational	6,300	$11M	OUA
Ontario Tech University	Ridgebacks	Oshawa	ON	2003	Public	10,000	—	OUA
University of Western Ontario	Mustangs	London	ON	1878	Public, formerly Roman Catholic	30,000	$685M	OUA
University of Windsor	Lancers	Windsor	ON	1857	Public, formerly Roman Catholic	13,496	$70M	OUA
McMaster University	Marauders	Hamilton	ON	1887	Public, formerly Baptist	25,688	$553M	OUA
University of Guelph	Gryphons	Guelph	ON	1964	Public	19,408	$264M	OUA
University of Waterloo	Warriors	Waterloo	ON	1957	Public	27,978	$282M	OUA
Wilfrid Laurier University	Golden Hawks	Waterloo	ON	1911	Public, formerly Lutheran	12,394	—	OUA
Brock University	Badgers	St. Catharines	ON	1964	Public	17,000	$74M	OUA
Lakehead University	Thunderwolves	Thunder Bay	ON	1946	Public	8,050	$32.1M	OUA
Concordia University	Stingers	Montreal	QC	1896	Public, formerly Roman Catholic and YMCA	38,809	$344.04M	RSEQ
Université Laval	Rouge et Or	Quebec City	QC	1663	Public	37,591	$105.3M	RSEQ
Université du Québec à Montréal	Citadins	Montreal	QC	1969	Public	39,235	—	RSEQ
McGill University	Redbirds (M), Martlets (W)	Montreal	QC	1821	Public	32,514	$1.32B	RSEQ
Bishop's University	Gaiters	Lennoxville	QC	1843	Public, formerly Anglican	2,800	—	RSEQ (Note: As of 2017, Bishop's plays football in AUS.)
École de technologie supérieure	Piranhas	Montreal	QC	1974	Public	11,000	—	RSEQ
Université de Montréal	Carabins	Montreal	QC	1878	Public, formerly Roman Catholic	55,540	$276M	RSEQ
Université du Québec à Trois-Rivières	Patriotes	Trois-Rivières	QC	1969	Public	10,000	—	RSEQ
Université de Sherbrooke	Vert & Or	Sherbrooke	QC	1954	Public, Roman Catholic	35,000	—	RSEQ
Université du Québec à Chicoutimi	Inuk	Chicoutimi	QC	1969	Public	6,500	—	RSEQ

== See also ==
- Canadian Collegiate Athletic Association
- FISU World University Games
- International University Sports Federation
- List of colleges in Canada
- List of universities in Canada
- National Collegiate Athletic Association
- University and college sport

== Notes and references ==
- Knowles, Steve (2000), "Canadian University Hockey", in Diamond, Dan (ed.), Total Hockey (Second ed.), Total Sports Pub., pp. 69–78, ISBN 1-892129-85-X
