= Mount Royal Cougars =

Athletic teams of Mount Royal University

- University: Mount Royal University
- Nickname: Cougars
- Association: U Sports
- Conference: Canada West
- Athletic director: Karla Karch
- Location: Calgary, Alberta
- Varsity teams: 8 (4 men's, 4 women's)
- Arena: Kenyon Court
- Soccer stadium: Mount Royal Field
- Other venues: Flames Community Arena
- Colours: Navy and Blue
- Mascot: Calvin the Cougar
- Website: mrucougars.com

The Mount Royal Cougars are the men's and women's athletic teams that represent Mount Royal University in Calgary, Alberta, Canada. The Cougars field eight varsity teams with four men's teams and four women's teams that compete in the Canada West Universities Athletic Association of U Sports. The Cougars were previously members of the Alberta Colleges Athletics Conference of the Canadian Colleges Athletic Association prior to the move to CIS (since renamed U Sports) in 2012.

== Varsity teams ==
| Men's sports | Women's sports |
|---|---|
| Basketball | Basketball |
| Ice hockey | Ice hockey |
| Soccer | Soccer |
| Volleyball | Volleyball |

=== Men's basketball ===
The Cougars men's basketball program has yielded two national championship teams as members of the Canadian Colleges Athletic Association, winning in 1979 and in 2009. Upon moving to the Canada West conference in 2012, the Cougars saw some success in the Explorers division in 2015 and 2016, but did not qualify for the playoffs until 2019 where they lost the play-in game to the Regina Cougars. The team plays their home games at the Kenyon Court on the MRU campus.

=== Women's basketball ===
The Cougars women's basketball team won one national championship in 2000 and six silver medals, most recently in 2004, while competing in the Canadian Colleges Athletic Association. The team recently made it to playoffs last season for their first time in USPORT history with the head coach, Robyn Fleckenstein. The team plays their home games at the Kenyon Court on the MRU campus.

=== Men's hockey ===
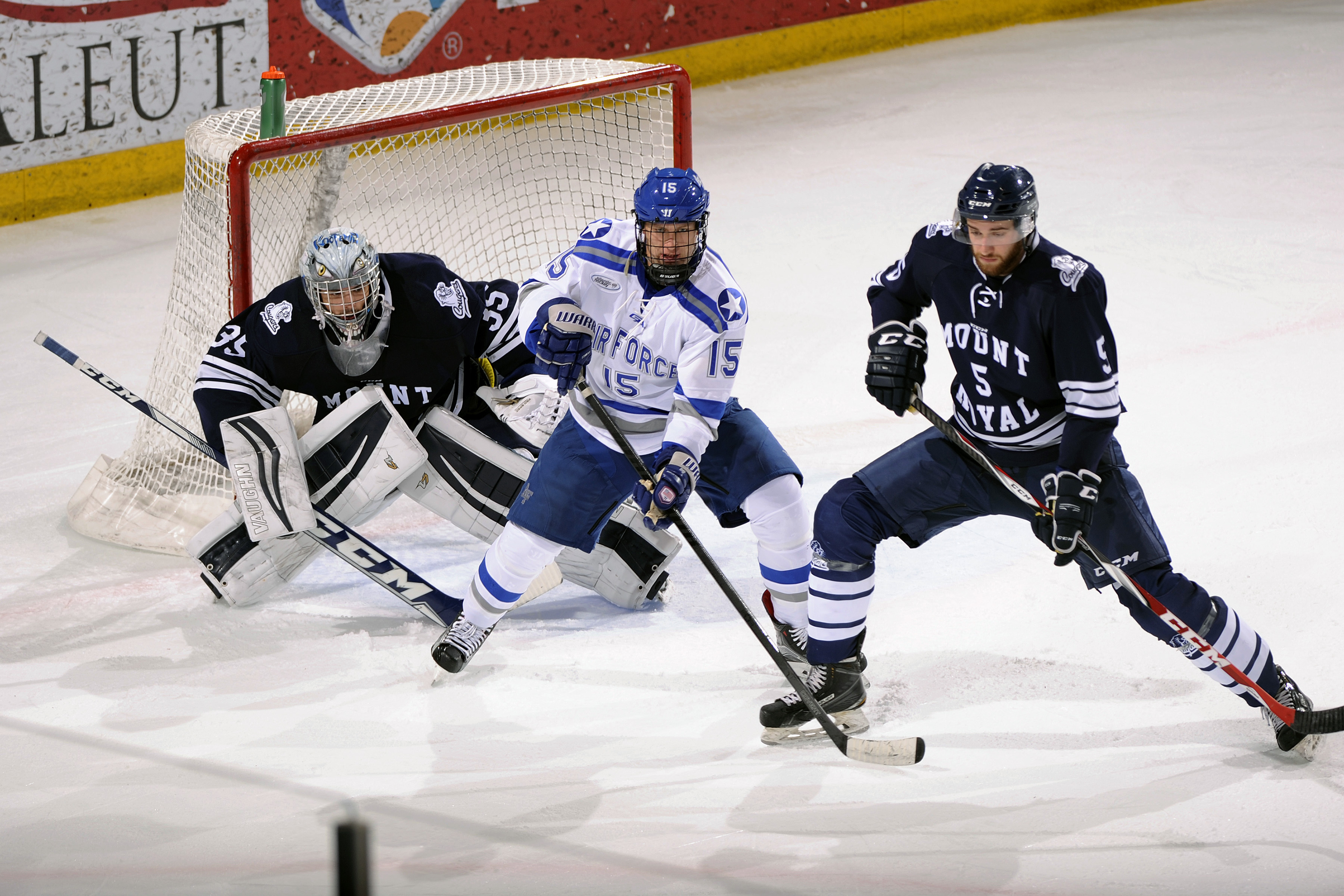
An exhibition game between the Mount Royal and Air Force Falcons men's ice hockey teams in 2016

The Cougars men's ice hockey team had won 12 Alberta Colleges Athletics Conference championships prior to the move to the Canada West Universities Athletic Association. The team first qualified for the Canada West playoffs in their second season in the conference in the 2013–14 season and consistently qualified for the playoffs in each season since then.

In the 2024-25 season, the Cougars have advanced to a conference final series for the first time in program history, where they lost to the University of Saskatchewan Huskies. They also earned their first ever spot in the University Cup playoffs where they faced the Toronto Metropolitan University Bold in the longest game in USports history. TMU won the game 5-4 in fifth overtime.

In the 2025-26 season, the Cougars repeated the previous year's achievements but fell to the Saskatchewan Huskies in the conference finals once again. In the national playoffs, they were eliminated by the University of Windsor Lancers.

The team plays home games at the Flames Community Arena.

=== Women's hockey ===
The Cougars women's ice hockey program first began play for the 2001–02 season and won five conference titles in their 11 years in the Alberta Colleges Athletics Conference. The team plays home games at the Flames Community Arena. After seeing initial challenges upon moving to the Canada West conference of CIS, the Cougars first qualified for the playoffs in 2017 where they lost to the Manitoba Bisons. The team won their first playoffs series in 2020 after defeating the Saskatchewan Huskies in the quarter-final and then went on to beat the Calgary Dinos in the semi-final before losing the Canada West final to the Alberta Pandas. As a conference finalist, the Cougars qualified for their first U Sports women's ice hockey championship tournament in 2020 and won their opening game, but the remainder of the tournament was cancelled due to the COVID-19 pandemic in Canada. The Cougars won the 2023 U Sports Women's Ice Hockey Championship as the 8 seed in the tournament, capturing their first national title.

=== Men's soccer ===
The Cougars men's soccer team won three national titles and 13 conference titles as members of the Alberta Colleges Athletics Conference. The Cougars first qualified for the playoffs in 2015 and played in the conference Final Four in 2019. The Cougars won their first Canada West Championship on their home field against the UBC Thunderbirds on 4 November 2023, winning the game 1-0. The team plays home games at Mount Royal Field.

=== Women's soccer ===
The Cougars women's soccer program first began in 1994 and wielded dominance over their 18-year tenure in the Alberta Colleges Athletics Conference by winning eight conference championships and only losing nine regular season games over those 18 years. In their fourth year in the Canada West Universities Athletic Association, in 2015, the Cougars first qualified for the playoffs where they lost to the Calgary Dinos. The team plays home games at Mount Royal Field.

=== Men's volleyball ===
The Cougars men's volleyball program had an outstanding run in the Alberta Colleges Athletics Conference after winning seven national championships along with 18 conference titles. As members of the Canada West Universities Athletic Association beginning in the 2012–13 season, the team first qualified for the conference playoffs in the 2015–16 season. The Cougars won their first playoff match in 2019 against the Saskatchewan Huskies, but lost in the semi-finals to the eventual conference champion Brandon Bobcats. However, due to their strong season, the Cougars were awarded an at-large berth in the 2019 U Sports Men's Volleyball Championship tournament, which was their first ever appearance in the national event. The Cougars finished in sixth place in the 2019 national tournament. The Cougars play their home games at the Kenyon Court on the MRU campus.

=== Women's volleyball ===
The Cougars women's volleyball team won one CCAA national championship in 2011 and 14 ACAC titles prior to the 2012 move to the Canada West Universities Athletic Association. In their first season in Canada West in 2012–13, the team qualified for the playoffs and defeated the UBC Okanagan Heat before losing to the Alberta Pandas in the conference semi-finals. The team was unable to again advance past the first round of the playoffs until 2020 when the Cougars won the conference bronze medal and qualified for their first U Sports national tournament in 2020. However, the tournament was cancelled due to the COVID-19 pandemic in Canada. The team plays their home games at the Kenyon Court on the MRU campus.
