= Jack Simpson Gymnasium =

Facility at the University of Calgary

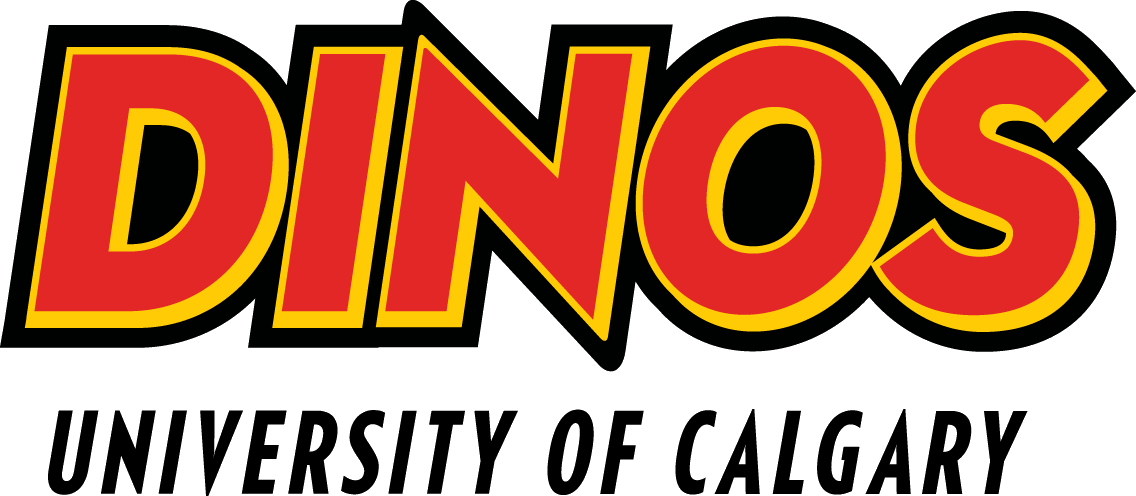
- Interactive map of Jack Simpson Gymnasium
- Address: 2500 University Drive NW; Calgary; Canada
- Coordinates: 51°4′40″N 114°8′1″W
- Owner: University of Calgary
- Operator: UCalgary Athletics
- Capacity: 3,454 (basketball)
- Type: Arena
- Current use: Basketball; Volleyball

Tenants
- Calgary Dinos (U Sports) teams: men's and women's basketball, volleyball (1987–Present); Calgary Outlaws (NBL) (1994)

Website
- godinos.com/jack-simpson-gym

The Jack Simpson Gymnasium is a multipurpose facility on the University of Calgary campus. It opened in 1987 to help host the 1988 XV Olympic Winter Games. It has three full gymnasiums, three basketball courts, five volleyball courts, and an indoor football/soccer field. The "Jack" is home to the Dinos volleyball and basketball teams. With a max seating capacity of 3454, it has hosted several CIS Championships, the annual Husky Dino Cup volleyball tournament, World League volleyball matches, and is the site for the University of Calgary's annual convocation ceremonies."

The facility is named after Jackson L. Simpson (1920-1984), the founder and former president of CANA Construction Company.
