= Toronto Varsity Blues =

Intercollegiate athletics teams of the University of Toronto

- University: University of Toronto
- Nickname: Varsity Blues
- Association: U Sports, CUFLA
- Conference: Ontario University Athletics
- Athletic director: Dalton Myers
- Location: Toronto, Ontario
- Varsity teams: 42 (21 men's, 21 women's)
- Football stadium: Varsity Stadium
- Basketball arena: Goldring Centre for High Performance Sport
- Ice hockey arena: Varsity Arena
- Baseball stadium: Dan Lang Field
- Soccer stadium: Varsity Stadium
- Aquatics center: Athletic Centre
- Lacrosse stadium: Varsity Stadium
- Tennis venue: UTSC Tennis Centre
- Indoor track and field venue: Athletic Centre
- Volleyball arena: Goldring Centre for High Performance Sport
- Wrestling venue: Athletic Centre
- Colours: U of T Blue and white
- Mascot: True Blue
- Fight song: The Blue and White
- Website: varsityblues.ca

The Toronto Varsity Blues (or U of T Varsity Blues) are the intercollegiate varsity sports teams that represent the University of Toronto. Its 43 athletic teams regularly participate in competitions held by Ontario University Athletics and U Sports.

The Varsity Blues trace their founding to 1877, with the formation of the men's football team. Since 1908, the program has expanded across the university's three campuses and Varsity Blues athletes have won numerous medals in Olympic and Paralympic Games and have also long competed in International University Sports Federation championships, Commonwealth Games, and Pan American Games.

== Varsity sports ==
Men's sports	Women's sports
Badminton	Badminton
Baseball	Basketball
Basketball	Cross country
Cross country	Curling
Curling	Fencing
Fencing	Field hockey
Figure skating	Figure skating
Football	Golf
Golf	Ice hockey
Ice hockey	Lacrosse
Lacrosse	Rowing
Rowing	Rugby
Rugby	Soccer
Soccer	Softball
Squash	Squash
Swimming	Swimming
Tennis	Tennis
Track and field	Track and field
Volleyball	Volleyball
Water polo	Water polo
Wrestling	Wrestling

=== Men's basketball ===
The Varsity Blues men's basketball team competes in the 18-team Ontario University Athletics conference, in the Central division. The team has won 14 Wilson Cup conference championships, second only to the Western Mustangs, including the first ever awarded for the 1908–09 season. The team most recently won the Wilson Cup in 1995. The team has yet to play in a national championship gold medal game. The team's head coach has been Madhav Trivedi since 2022.

=== Women's basketball ===
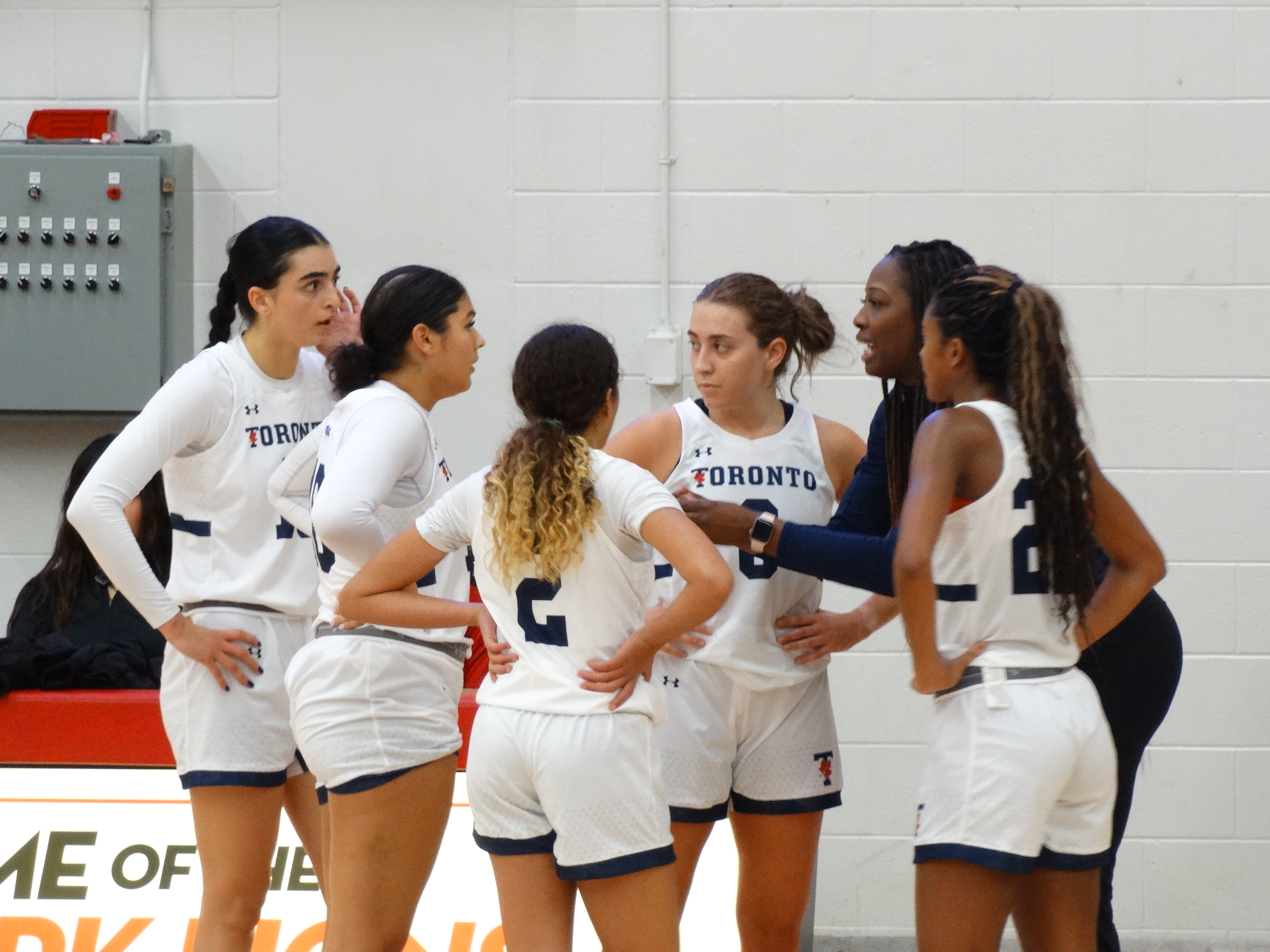
Varsity Blues women's basketball team in 2023

The Varsity Blues women's basketball team competes in the 18-team Ontario University Athletics conference, in the Central division. The team has won nine Critelli Cup conference championships, most recently in 2002. The team won a national championship in 1986 and also won silver medals in 1994 and 1996. Tamara Tatham was appointed the team's head coach in April 2021 after serving as the interim head coach during the 2020–21 season.

=== Football ===
The Varsity Blues football team was first organized in 1877 and hold the distinction of winning the first Grey Cup in 1909 and the first Vanier Cup in 1965. The team won national dominion championships in 1895, 1905, 1909, 1910, 1911, and 1920 when university teams played against other amateur clubs. The team also won the first Yates Cup conference championship in 1898 and has won 25 overall, which are the second-most in U Sports, but have not won since 1993, when they also won the 29th Vanier Cup.

=== Men's ice hockey ===
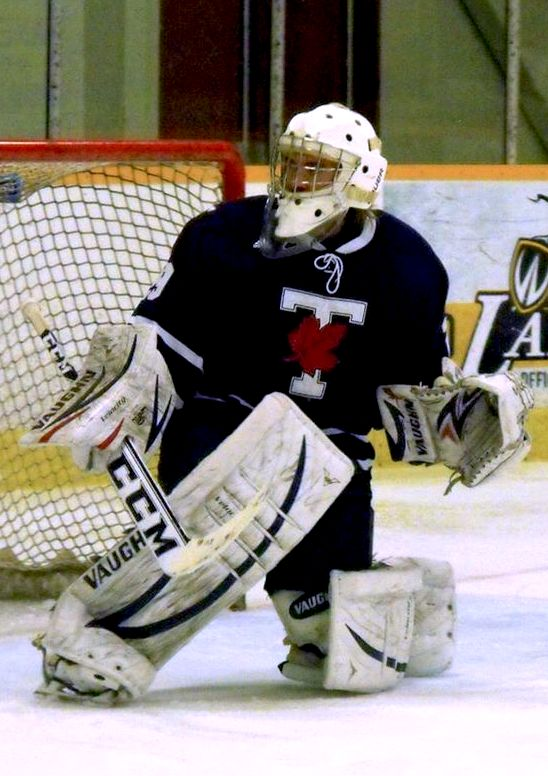
The Varsity Blues goalie in 2014

The Varsity Blues men's ice hockey team plays in the Ontario University Athletics conference and is coached by Ryan Medel. The team is based at Varsity Arena. The current Varsity Blues have won ten U Sports Championships. The men's ice hockey team was founded in 1891. The Varsity Blues senior team won the Allan Cup in 1921 and 1927 and won the gold medal at the 1928 Winter Olympics. Conn Smythe (U of T 1920), the principal owner of the NHL Toronto Maple Leafs (1927–61) and builder of Maple Leaf Gardens (1931), chose Royal Blue and White as his team's colours to honour his alma mater. The Maple Leafs are popularly known as "The Blue and White" by many of their older fans.

=== Women's ice hockey ===
The Varsity Blues women's ice hockey team competes in the 18-team Ontario University Athletics conference, in the OUA East division. The team has won 19 McCaw Cup conference championships, most recently in 2023. The team won a national championship in 2001 and also won silver medals in 1998 and 2003. Vicky Sunohara has served as the team's head coach since the 2011–12 season.

=== Nordic skiing ===
The Nordic skiing team competes against Ontario universities each year at the OUA Championships in February after qualifying races earlier in the season. The team has steadily grown in size and experience since Hans Fischer stepped up to the position of coach in the 2005–06 season.

=== Rowing ===
The University of Toronto Rowing Club represents the Varsity Blues at local and international regattas. The UTRC was founded on February 10, 1897, and throughout the years has had many successes, including Royal Canadian Henley Regatta victories, OUA titles, and a silver medal at the 1924 Summer Olympics in Paris.

=== Men's soccer ===
The Varsity Blues men's soccer team competes in the 18-team Ontario University Athletics conference, in the East division. The team has won 50 Blackwood Cup conference championships, including seasons where they were co-champions and division champions. The team won a national championship in 1988. Ilya Orlov has been the team's head coach since January 2019.

=== Women's soccer ===
The Varsity Blues women's soccer team competes in the 18-team Ontario University Athletics conference, in the East division. The team has yet to win a conference championship or a national championship. The team is led by associate head coach Angelo Cavalluzzo.

=== Women's track & field ===
Middle and long-distance runner Sasha Gollish was named 2015 Canadian Interuniversity Sport (CIS) Female Athlete of the Year (track events) for her performance at the CIS Championships, winning three gold medals in the 1000m, 3000m, and 4 × 800 m relay events and two silver medals in the 600m and 1500m events, the most individual medals ever won by a distance athlete. She was also named MVP of the 2015 Ontario University Athletics (OUA) Championships after winning three individual gold medals in the 600m, 1500m, and 3000m events. In November 2015, she was named one of the Top 8 Academic All-Canadians by Canadian Interuniversity Sport.

=== Men's volleyball ===
The Varsity Blues men's volleyball team competes in the 13-team Ontario University Athletics conference. The team has won 15 Forsyth Cup conference championships, most recently in 2004. The team most recently won the Wilson Cup in 1995. In the national championship tournament, the team won a silver medal in 1991 and a bronze medal in 1985. The team has been led by head coach John Barrett since the 2011–12 season.

=== Women's volleyball ===
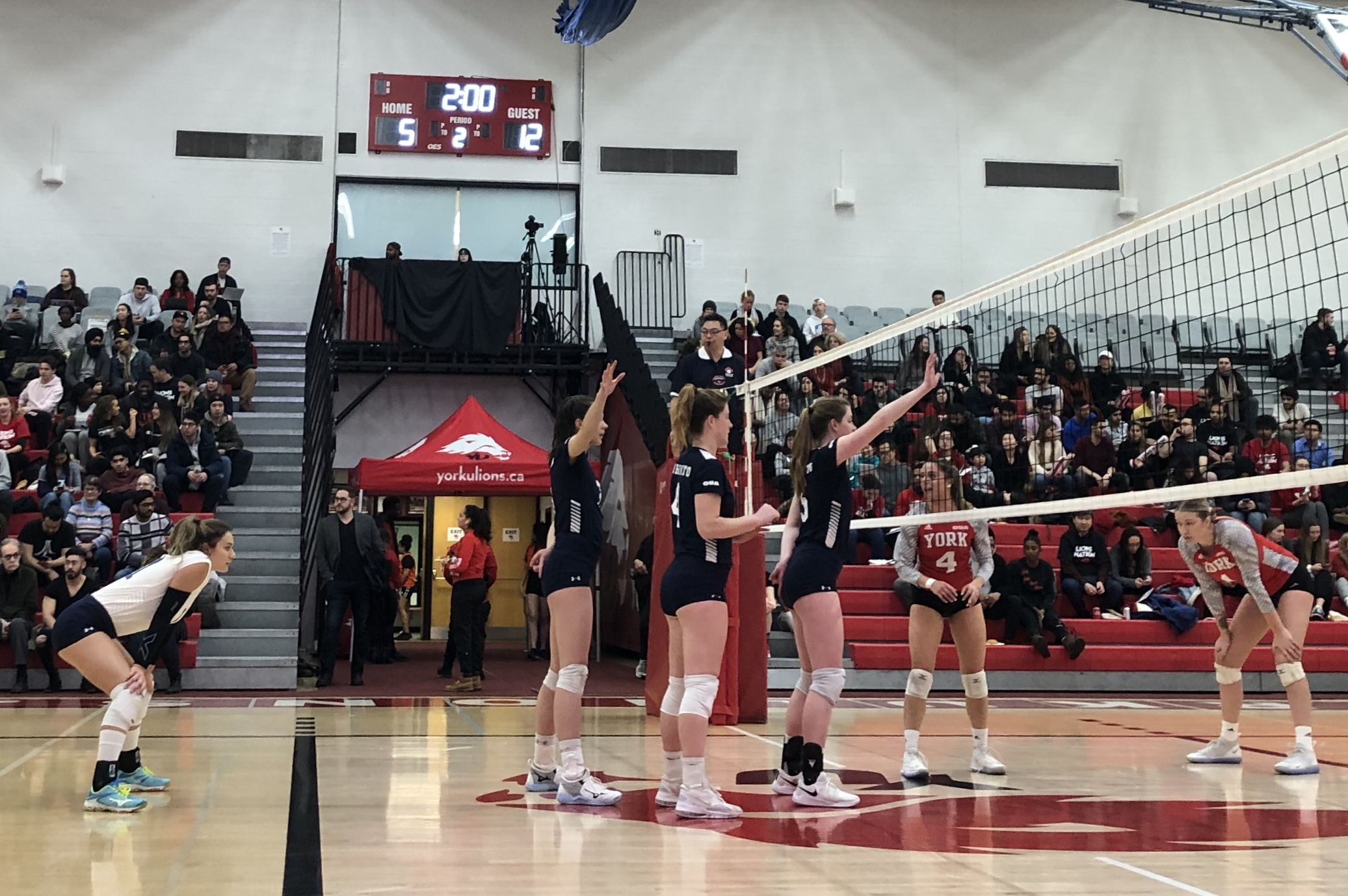
Varsity Blues women's volleyball team in 2020

The Varsity Blues women's volleyball team competes in the 14-team Ontario University Athletics conference. The team has won 12 Quigley Cup conference championships, most recently in 2020. The team won a national championship in 2016, becoming the first OUA team to win since 1976, and also won a silver medal in 1971. Kristine Drakich has served as the team's head coach since the 1989–90 season and was named U Sports coach of the year in 2015.

== Awards and honours ==
=== Lieutenant Governor Athletic Awards ===
Five Varsity Blues athletes have won Lois and Doug Mitchell U Sports Athletes of the Year Awards.

- 1996: Justine Ellison (Basketball)
- 1998: Foy Williams (Track & Field)
- 2002: Elizabeth Warden (Swimming)
- 2016: Kylie Masse (Swimming)
- 2023: Gabriel Mastromatteo (Swimming)

=== Frank Pindar Athlete of the Year ===
Presented annually to a male/female varsity athlete competing in a sport whose official season concludes with either an OUA or other university recognized championship event, who exhibits the highest degree of excellence while representing the University of Toronto at competitions during the team's intercollegiate schedule for the current academic year.

Year	Female Athlete	Sport	Male Athlete	Sport
2015	Breanna Gadzosa	Water Polo	Michael Chapman	Water Polo
2016	Rachel Honderich	Badminton	Zain Manji	Tennis
2017	Bethany So	Badminton	Jonathan Lai	Badminton
2018	Laura Upenieks	Golf	William Kinney	Fencing
2019	Emily Principe	Fencing	Jonathan Lai	Badminton
2020	Rachael Jaffe	Water Polo	Jonathan Lai	Badminton
2021	N/A	N/A	N/A	N/A
2022	Chyna Hui	Figure Skating	Colin McCurdy	Fencing
2023	Winnie Choi	Tennis	Patrick Conn	Water Polo
2024	Anastasiya Dyadchenko	Tennis	Owen Taylor	Baseball

=== T-Holders' Association Athletic Award Athletes of the year ===
Year	Female athlete	Sport	Male athlete	Sport
2011–12	Vanessa Treasure	Swimming	Mike Smerek	Swimming
2012–13			Zack Chetrat	Swimming
2013–14	Nicole Kesteris	Hockey	Zack Chetrat	Swimming
2014–15	Sasha Gollish	Track & Field	Eli Wall	Swimming
2015–16	Kylie Masse	Swimming	Sacha Smart	Track & Field
2016–17	Kylie Masse	Swimming	Rostam Turner	Track & Field
2017–18	Kylie Masse	Swimming	Eli Wall	Swimming
2018–19	Kylie Masse	Swimming	Ezana Debalkew	Track & Field
2019–20	Lucia Stafford	Cross country	David Thomson	Hockey

== See also ==
- List of University of Toronto alumni
- True Blue (mascot)
- "The Blue and White" (song)
- UTM Eagles
