= U Sports women's volleyball =

Canadian university volleyball competition

- Formerly: CWIAU Volleyball; CIAU Volleyball; CIS Volleyball
- Sport: Volleyball
- Founded: 1969; 57 years ago
- No. of teams: 43, in four conferences
- Country: Canada
- Most recent champion: Alberta Pandas (2026)
- Most titles: UBC Thunderbirds (14)
- Related competitions: U Sports Volleyball Championship
- Website: usports.ca/wvball

U Sports women's volleyball is the highest level of amateur play of indoor volleyball in Canada and operates under the auspices of U Sports (formerly Canadian Interuniversity Sport). 43 teams from Canadian universities are divided into four athletic conferences, drawing from the four regional associations of U Sports: Canada West Universities Athletic Association (CW), Ontario University Athletics (OUA), Réseau du sport étudiant du Québec (RSEQ), and Atlantic University Sport (AUS). Following intra-conference playoffs, eight teams are selected to play in a national tournament to compete for the U Sports women's volleyball championship.

== Brief history ==
Organized university volleyball was first played in Ontario in the 1947-48 school year between the Toronto Varsity Blues and the McMaster Marauders where the two teams finished tied for the championship title. Toronto would win the 1948-49 title in the following year. In the Western Canada Intercollegiate Athletic Union (WCIAU), the Saskatchewan Huskies were named the first champions in Western Canada for the 1949-50 season. In 1950-51, volleyball was admitted as a sport into the Women’s Intercollegiate Athletic Union (WIAU) with Toronto, McMaster, Western, and OAC becoming the first four programs to compete in an Ontario league. For the 1952-93 season, McGill and Queen's joined competition in the WIAU. The Atlantic Intercollegiate Athletic Association (AIAA) began awarding championships for volleyball for the 1959-60 season which was won by the UNB Reds.

In 1969, the Canadian Women’s Interuniversity Athletic Union (CWIAU) was formed to provide a national governing body for women's varsity sport in Canada. In December 1969, the WCIAU proposed by that national championships should be established, which was accepted by the CWIAU. Because this was accepted in the middle of the school year, an unofficial national championship was held at the University of Waterloo and won by the Calgary Dinos in the spring of 1970. The first official championship was awarded following the 1970-71 season and was won by the Manitoba Bisonettes over the Toronto Varsity Blues in a match that was decided in four sets.

Beginning with the 1972-73 season, the Manitoba Bisons, Winnipeg Wesmen, and Regina Cougars played in the separate Great Plains Athletic Association (later renamed Great Plains Athletic Conference (GPAC)) while the Saskatchewan Huskies and teams from Alberta and British Columbia played in the Canada West Universities Athletic Association (CWUAA). The GPAC and CWUAA combined back into one conference starting in the 2001-02 season. The 2020 championship tournament and the entire 2020–21 season were cancelled due to the COVID-19 pandemic.

== Season structure ==
=== Exhibition season ===
To prepare for the season, teams will typically play a series of exhibition games against conference and non-conference opponents. These games are usually played in September and/or October before the regular season and in December and/or January during the holiday break.

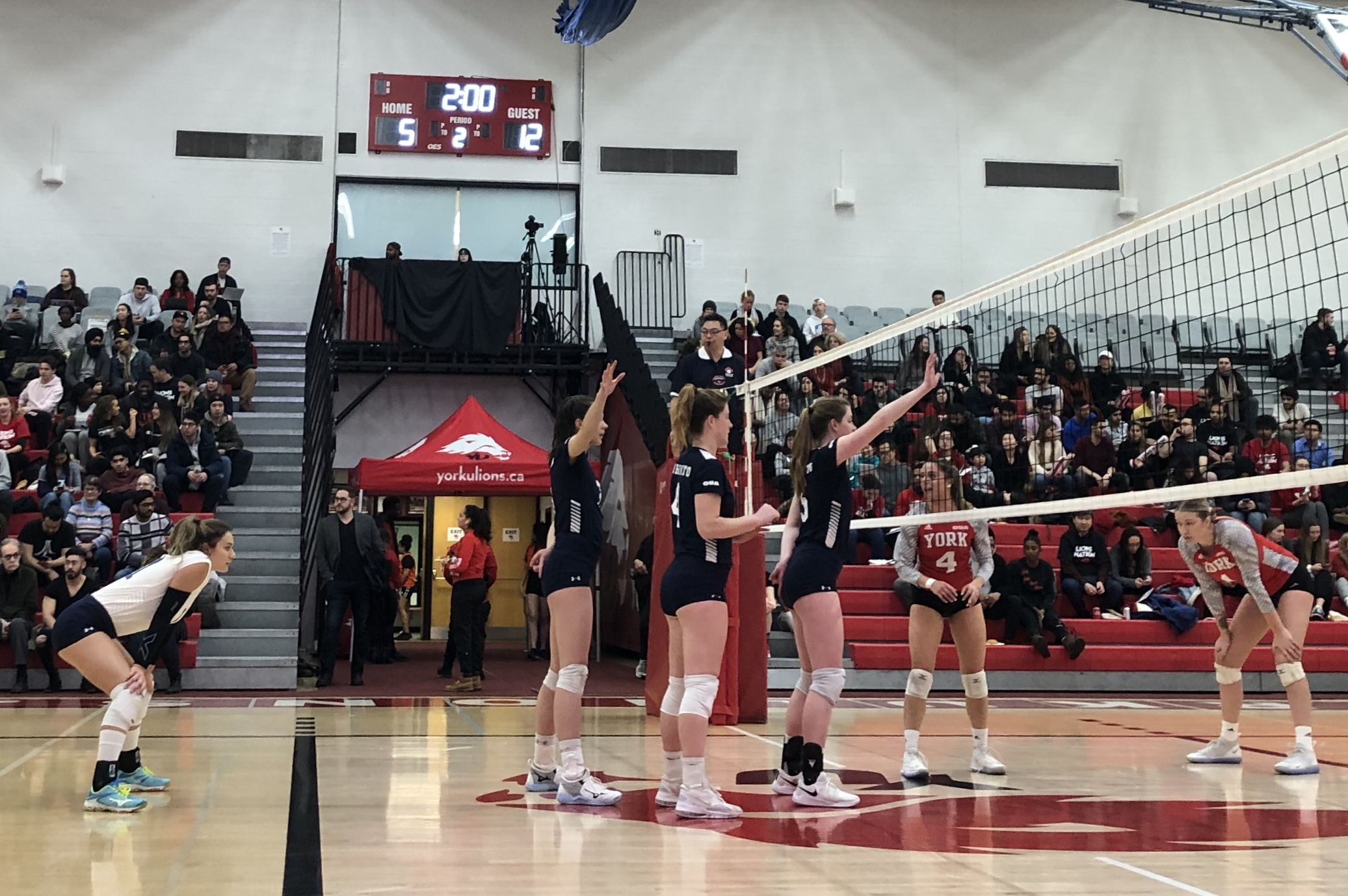
The York Lions hosting the Toronto Varsity Blues in 2020.

=== Regular season ===
As of the 2023-24 season, the RSEQ begin their season first, on the second Friday of October. The Canada West conference begins play one week later and the AUS and OUA schedules begin on the fourth Friday of October. All regular season games are in-conference and the schedule ends in approximately mid-February.

The AUS conference features six teams that play four games against each opponent for a total of 20 regular season games. In the RSEQ, eight teams play 21 conference games for a total of three games against each opponent. In Canada West, there are 14 teams in one conference that play against ten other opponents resulting in 20 total games played. The OUA features 15 teams in one conference after previously having teams split in an east and west division. OUA teams play two games against 10 different opponents, leaving four teams as non-combatants for each team's schedule. For the OUA and Canada West conferences, teams will usually play the same opponent twice in one weekend for ease of travel and scheduling.

Following the conclusion of the regular season, the Mary Lyons Award is awarded annually to the Player of the Year in U Sports women's volleyball. The Mark Tennant Award is given to the Rookie of the Year and the Thérèse Quigley Award is given to the best well-rounded student (volleyball, academics and community involvement). An award was also given for the Libero of the Year, but it was discontinued after the 2014-15 season.

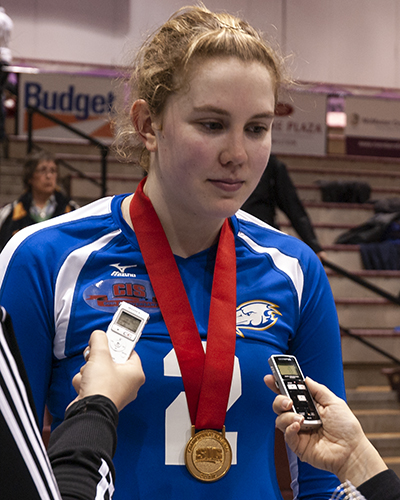
UBC's Lisa Barclay won the 2014 Mary Lyons Award and three national championships.

=== Playoffs ===
After the regular season, playoff games and series are held between the top teams in each conference to determine conference champions. In the AUS and RSEQ conferences, the top four teams qualify for the playoffs and play a best-of-three series including in the conference championship. In Canada West, the top eight teams qualify for the playoffs and play best-of-three series in playoff brackets in the quarterfinals. The winners of these series play in best-of-three semifinals until two teams remain where they play in a single elimination conference championship game.

The OUA is the only conference that features a single elimination format in all playoff games. Teams are seeded one through eight and advance to the semi-finals in a bracket format with the higher-seeded team hosting each game. The highest-seeded remaining team hosts the conference championship, the Quigley Cup.

=== National championship ===
The U Sports women's volleyball championship was officially established in 1971 following the organization of the Canadian Women’s Interuniversity Athletic Union (CWIAU). A predetermined host university stages the eight-team tournament over three days and finals games are played on the last day to award gold, silver, and bronze medals. The host team is automatically qualified for the tournament, as are each of the conference champions. Three other teams are entered based on the strength of their conferences and their post-season finishes. The UBC Thunderbirds have won the most championships with 14 gold medals won, followed by the eight titles won by the Manitoba Bisons. The national championship has historically been dominated by the Canada West conference with those teams winning 44 of the 53 championship matches as of the 2024-25 season. The 2020 and 2021 championship tournaments were cancelled due to the COVID-19 pandemic.

== Teams ==
=== Membership ===
There were 43 teams that had participated in the 2025–26 Women's volleyball season. Recently, St. Francis Xavier and Cape Breton previously had programs is the AUS conference, but they were cut due to budgetary reasons in 2013 and 2015, respectively. On the opposite side, the Canada West conference has seen a growth in team membership, adding the UBCO Heat in 2011-12, Mount Royal Cougars in 2012-13, MacEwan Griffins in 2014-15, and the UFV Cascades in 2020-21. The UQTR Patriotes are playing in the RSEQ Division 1 as of the 2021-22 season after playing in the conference's Division 2. After becoming the 57th member of U Sports, the UQAC Inuk fielded a women's volleyball team beginning in 2023. The ETS Piranhas became a member of U Sports in 2024 with their women's volleyball team playing the same year. The Ottawa Gee-Gees announced intentions to move from the RSEQ and joined the OUA beginning with the 2024-25 season. Following the return of Simon Fraser University to U Sports, the Red Leafs will join the Canada West conference for the 2027–28 season.

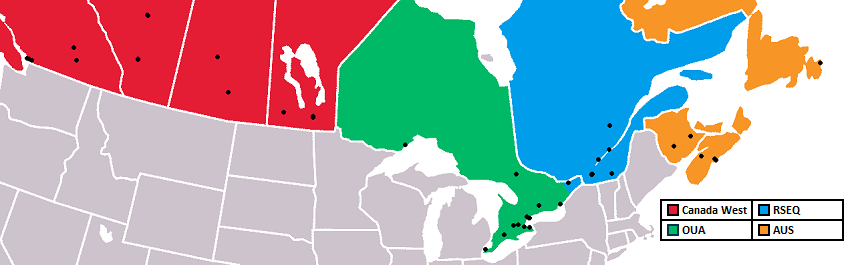

=== Canada West ===
University	Varsity Name	City	Province	Arena	CWC	NC
University of British Columbia	Thunderbirds	Vancouver	BC	War Memorial Gymnasium	16	14
Trinity Western University	Spartans	Langley	BC	Langley Events Centre	6	2
University of the Fraser Valley	Cascades	Abbotsford	BC	Envision Athletic Centre	0	0
Thompson Rivers University	WolfPack	Kamloops	BC	Tournament Capital Centre	0	0
University of British Columbia Okanagan	Heat	Kelowna	BC	UBC Okanagan Gymnasium	0	0
University of Calgary	Dinos	Calgary	AB	Jack Simpson Gymnasium	9	3
Mount Royal University	Cougars	Calgary	AB	Kenyon Court	0	0
University of Alberta	Pandas	Edmonton	AB	Saville Community Sports Centre	20	8
MacEwan University	Griffins	Edmonton	AB	Dr. David W. Atkinson Gymnasium	0	0
University of Saskatchewan	Huskies	Saskatoon	SK	Physical Activity Complex	13	3
University of Regina	Cougars	Regina	SK	Centre for Kinesiology, Health & Sport	0	0
University of Brandon	Bobcats	Brandon	MB	Healthy Living Centre	0	0
University of Manitoba	Bisons	Winnipeg	MB	Investors Group Athletic Centre	7	8
University of Winnipeg	Wesmen	Winnipeg	MB	Duckworth Centre	0	7

- Note: Conference titles won by teams in the Great Plains Athletic Conference (1972-73 season to 2000-01 season) are not included in the above table due to lack of information on this conference.

=== Ontario University Athletics ===
University	Varsity Name	City	Province	Arena	OC	NC
Lakehead University	Thunderwolves	Thunder Bay	ON	The Wolf Den	0	0
University of Windsor	Lancers	Windsor	ON	St. Denis Centre	1	0
University of Western Ontario	Mustangs	London	ON	Alumni Hall	11	3
University of Waterloo	Warriors	Waterloo	ON	Physical Activities Complex	0	0
University of Guelph	Gryphons	Guelph	ON	Guelph Gryphons Athletic Centre	0	0
McMaster University	Marauders	Hamilton	ON	Burridge Gymnasium	4	0
Brock University	Badgers	St. Catharines	ON	Bob Davis Gymnasium	4	0
Nipissing University	Lakers	North Bay	ON	Robert J. Surtees Student Athletics Centre	0	0
York University	Lions	Toronto	ON	Tait McKenzie Centre	15	0
University of Toronto	Varsity Blues	Toronto	ON	Goldring Centre	12	1
Toronto Metropolitan University	Bold	Toronto	ON	Mattamy Athletic Centre	1	1
Trent University	Excalibur	Peterborough	ON	Trent Athletics Centre	0	0
Queen's University	Gaels	Kingston	ON	Athletics & Recreation Centre	1	0
Royal Military College of Canada	Paladins	Kingston	ON	SAM Gym	0	0
University of Ottawa	Gee-Gees	Ottawa	ON	Montpetit Hall	5	0

- Note: The Ottawa Gee-Gees played in the RSEQ from 2016 to 2024.

=== Réseau du sport étudiant du Québec ===
University	Varsity Name	City	Province	Arena	CC	NC
Université Laval	Rouge et Or	Quebec City	QC	PEPS gymnase	25	1
McGill University	Martlets	Montreal	QC	Love Competition Hall	1	0
Université de Montréal	Carabins	Montreal	QC	CEPSUM	16	0
Université du Québec à Chicoutimi	Inuk	Chicoutimi	QC	Pavillon sportif de l'UQAC	0	0
Université du Québec à Montréal	Citadins	Montreal	QC	Centre sportif UQAM	1	0
Université du Québec à Trois-Rivières	Patriotes	Trois-Rivières	QC	Centre de l'Activité Physique et Sportive	0	0
Université de Sherbrooke	Vert et Or	Sherbrooke	QC	Centre sportif Yvon-Lamarche	10	2
École de technologie supérieure	Piranhas	Montreal	QC	Centre sportif ÉTS	0	0

=== Atlantic University Sport ===
University	Varsity Name	City	Province	Arena	AC	NC
Université de Moncton	Aigles Bleues	Moncton	NB	CEPS	6	0
University of New Brunswick	Reds	Fredericton	NB	Richard J Currie Centre	19	0
Acadia University	Axewomen	Wolfville	NS	Stu Aberdeen Court	1	0
Dalhousie University	Tigers	Halifax	NS	Dalplex Fieldhouse	27	1
Saint Mary's University	Huskies	Halifax	NS	Homburg Centre	8	0
Memorial University of Newfoundland	Sea-Hawks	St. John's	NL	The Field House	3	0
