= Réseau du sport étudiant du Québec =

Governing body of student sport in Quebec

- Formerly: ASUQ / QUAA; 1971–1989; FSSQ / QSSF; 1989–2010
- Association: U Sports; CCAA/ACSC; NFHS
- Founded: 1971; 55 years ago
- President: Gustave Roel
- Motto: Sport. Éducation. Fierté. (lit. 'Sport. Education. Pride.')
- Sports fielded: Athletics; Badminton; Baseball; Basketball; Cheerleading; Cross-country; Field lacrosse; Field hockey; Flag football; Football; Futsal; Golf; Ice hockey; Indoor soccer; Rugby; Skiing; Soccer; Street hockey; Swimming; Volleyball; Ultimate
- Country: Canada
- Headquarters: Montreal
- Region: Quebec

Notes
- rseq.ca

The Réseau du sport étudiant du Québec (lit. 'Quebec Student Sports Network'), abbreviated RSEQ, is the governing body of primary and secondary school, collegiate, and university sport in Quebec. It also serves as a regional membership association for Canadian universities which assists in co-ordinating competition between their university level athletic programs and providing contact information, schedules, results, and releases about those programs and events to the public and the media. This is similar to what would be called a "college athletic conference" in the United States.

The RSEQ was founded in 1971 as the Association sportive universitaire du Québec/Quebec University Athletic Association, abbreviated as ASUQ and QUAA, following the reformulation of three university athletic associations spanning the universities of Ontario and Quebec. After the merger between Quebec's university, collegiate, and high school governing bodies in 1989, the amalgamated association was named the Fédération du sport scolaire du Québec/Quebec Student Sports Federation, abbreviated FSSQ and QSSF. The current name has been in use since November 2010.

The RSEQ is one of four provincial governing bodies that are members of the national governing body for university athletics, U Sports. The other three regional associations coordinating university-level sports in Canada are Ontario University Athletics (OUA), Atlantic University Sport (AUS), and the Canada West Universities Athletic Association (Canada West, CW).

As with all of Canada's provincial high school athletics associations, the RSEQ is an affiliate member of the United States–based National Federation of State High School Associations (NFHS).

== Member schools ==
Locations of the RSEQ member institutions.
U Sports member
Non-U Sports member
Locations of the Montreal based schools.
U Sports member

=== U Sports member schools ===
Institution	Nickname	Location in Quebec	Founded	Type	Enrollment	Endowment	Joined
Bishop's University	Gaiters	Lennoxville	1843	Public	2,724	$32.5M	1974
Concordia University	Stingers	Montreal	1896	Public	45,954	$120.4M	1974
Université Laval	Rouge et Or	Quebec City	1663	Public	37,591	$108.3M	1971
McGill University	Redbirds & Martlets	Montreal	1821	Public	34,819	$1.27B	1971
Université de Montréal	Carabins	Montreal	1878	Public	58,482	$189.2M	1971
Université du Québec à Chicoutimi	Inuk	Chicoutimi	1969	Public	6,583	---	2023
Université du Québec à Montréal	Citadins	Montreal	1969	Public	41,325	---	1971
École de technologie supérieure	Piranhas	Montreal	1974	Public	6,300		2024
Université du Québec à Trois-Rivières	Patriotes	Trois-Rivières	1969	Public	12,500	---	1971
Université de Sherbrooke	Vert et Or	Sherbrooke	1954	Public	35,000	---	1971

Since the 2017–18 school year, Bishop's has played football in AUS, but remains a member of RSEQ in other sports.

=== Non-U Sports member schools ===
Note: The following universities below are not members of U Sports, and are solely RSEQ members and participate in certain sports.

Institution	Nickname	Location (Quebec)	Founded	Type	Enrollment	Endowment	Joined
Université du Québec en Outaouais	Torrents	Gatineau	1981	Public	6,017		
Université du Québec à Rimouski	Nordets	Rimouski	1969	Public	~5,400		

=== CCAA member schools ===
The RSEQ also oversees college sports in Quebec, and the following are members of the Canadian Collegiate Athletic Association/Association canadienne du sport collégial (CCAA/ACSC).

Institution	Nickname	Location (Quebec)	Founded	Type	Enrollment	Endowment	Joined
Cégep de l'Abitibi-Témiscamingue	Gaillards (men's); Astrelles (women's)	Rouyn-Noranda					
Collège Ahuntsic	Aigles (formerly Indiens)	Montreal					
Collège d'Alma	Jeannois	Alma					
Collège André-Grasset	Phénix	Montreal					
Cégep André-Laurendeau	Boomerang	Montreal					
Cégep de Baie-Comeau	Trappeurs	Baie-Comeau					
Cégep Beauce-Appalaches	Condors	Saint-Georges					
Collège de Bois-de-Boulogne	Cavaliers	Montreal					
Centre d'études collégiales Matapédien	Alizé	Amqui					
Centre d'études collégiales de Montmagny	Combattants	Montmagny					
Champlain College Lennoxville	Cougars	Lennoxville					
Champlain College Saint-Lambert	Cavaliers	Saint-Lambert					
Champlain College St. Lawrence	Lions	Quebec City					
Cégep de Chicoutimi	Couguars	Saguenay					
Cégep de Drummondville	Voltigeurs	Drummondville					
Collège Édouard-Montpetit	Lynx	Longueuil					
Cégep François-Xavier-Garneau	Élans	Quebec City					
Cégep de la Gaspésie et des Îles	Bleu Marin	Gaspé					
Collège Gérald-Godin	Gladiateurs	Montreal					
Cégep de Granby Haute-Yamaska	Inouk	Granby					
Harrington College	Icebergs	Oka					
Heritage College	Hurricane	Gatineau					
Collège Jean-de-Brébeuf	Dynamiques	Montreal					
John Abbott College	Islanders	Sainte-Anne-de-Bellevue					
Cégep de Jonquière	Gaillards	Saguenay					
Cégep de La Pocatière	Gaulois (men's); Monadnocks (women's)	La Pocatière					
Collège Laflèche	Dragons	Trois-Rivières					
Cégep régional de Lanaudière à L'Assomption	Cyclones	L'Assomption					
Cégep régional de Lanaudière à Joliette	Pistolets	Joliette					
Cégep régional de Lanaudière à Terrebonne	Rafales	Terrebonne					
Cégep de Lévis-Lauzon	Faucons	Lévis					
Cégep Limoilou	Titans	Quebec City					
Cégep Lionel-Groulx	Nordiques	Sainte-Thérèse					
Collège de Maisonneuve	Vikings	Montreal					
Marianopolis College	Demons	Westmount					
Cégep Marie-Victorin	Trappeurs	Montreal					
Cégep de Matane	Éoles	Matane					
Collège Mérici	Panthères	Quebec City					
Collège Montmorency	Nomades	Laval					
Campus Notre-Dame-de-Foy	Notre-Dame	Saint-Augustin-de-Desmaures					
Collège préuniversitaire Nouvelles Frontières	Préu	Gatineau					
Cégep de l'Outaouais	Griffons	Gatineau					
Cégep de Rimouski	Pionniers	Rimouski					
Cégep de Rivière-du-Loup	Portageurs	Rivière-du-Loup					
Collège de Rosemont	Gaulois	Montreal					
Séminaire de Sherbrooke	Barons	Sherbrooke					
Cégep de Sept-Îles	Voyageurs	Sept-Îles					
Collège Shawinigan	Électriks	Shawinigan					
Cégep de Sherbrooke	Volontaires	Sherbrooke					
Cégep de Sorel-Tracy	Rebelles	Sorel-Tracy					
Cégep de Sainte-Foy	Dynamiques	Quebec City					
Cégep de Saint-Félicien	Kioki	Saint-Félicien					
Cégep de Saint-Hyacinthe	Lauréats	Saint-Hyacinthe					
Cégep de Saint-Jean-sur-Richelieu	Géants	Saint-Jean-sur-Richelieu					
Cégep de Saint-Jérôme	Cheminots	Saint-Jérôme					
Cégep de Saint-Laurent	Patriotes	Montreal					
Cégep de Thetford	Filons	Thetford Mines					
Cégep de Trois-Rivières	Diablos	Trois-Rivières					
Cégep de l'Abitibi-Témiscamingue (Campus de Val-d'Or)	Météores	Val-d'Or					
Collège de Valleyfield	Noir et Or	Salaberry-de-Valleyfield					
Vanier College	Cheetahs	Montreal					
Cégep de Victoriaville	Vulkins	Victoriaville					
Cégep du Vieux Montreal	Spartiates	Montreal					

== Facilities ==
Facilities
Institution	Football Stadium	Seated Capacity	Basketball/Volleyball Gym	Seated Capacity	Hockey Arena	Seated Capacity	Soccer Stadium	Seated Capacity
Bishop's	Coulter Field	2200	John H. Price Sports Centre	1400	W.B. Scott Arena	1200	Coulter Field	2200
Concordia	Concordia Stadium	4000	Concordia Gymnasium	750	Ed Meagher Arena	1000	Concordia Stadium	4000
Laval	PEPS stade extérieur	12,257*	PEPS gymnase	2500	Non-hockey school		PEPS soccer fields	--
McGill	Molson Stadium	23,420	Love Competition Hall	1500	McConnell Arena	950	Molson Stadium	23,420
Montréal	CEPSUM Stadium	5100	Non-basketball school		Aréna du CEPSUM	2460	CEPSUM Stadium	5100
Sherbrooke	Stade de l'UdeS	3359	Non-basketball school		Non-hockey school		Stade de l'Université de Sherbrooke	3359
UQAM	Non-football school		UQAM Centre sportif	600	Non-hockey school		terrain # 2 of Complexe sportif Claude-Robillard	1000
UQTR	Non-football school		Non-basketball school		Colisée de Trois-Rivières	2700	Stade de l'UQTR	1500

(*Laval's PEPS stade extérieur has an official seated capacity of 12,257 although it has held a standing room crowd of over 18,000 and as such is often listed as having a maximum capacity of 18,000.)

(Data mined from the U Sports homepage's member directory and WorldStadiums.com. The members directory numbers seem to be ballpark figures in some cases.)

== See also ==
=== Associations ===
- U Sports
- Canadian Collegiate Athletic Association

=== Leagues ===
- Quebec University Football League
- Hockey collégial féminin RSEQ
- U Sports Women's Basketball
- U Sports Football
- U Sports Women's Ice Hockey
- U Sports Men's Soccer
- U Sports Women's Soccer
- U Sports Men's Volleyball
- U Sports Women's Volleyball
