= National Rural Research Network =

Environmental organisation in Canada

- Location: Ottawa, Ontario
- Affiliations: Canadian Rural Revitalization Foundation
- Website: crrf.concordia.ca/NRRN

National Rural Research Network (NRRN) (Francais: Réseau National de Researche Rurale) is an organization representing post-secondary students, academics, government representatives, and community development practitioners interested in rural development issues, opportunities, and challenges in Canada. NRRN was established in 2005 through funding of the Rural Secretariat and facilitated by the Canadian Rural Revitalization Foundation. The purpose of NRRN is to facilitate the research and information needs of people involved in rural community development. In particular, NRRN is involved with policy and program practitioners across all levels of government; community leaders in economic and social development; producers and producer associations; rural researchers; and those who commission or who seek funding for rural research.

== Events ==
To facilitate opportunities for community leaders, students, academics, and government to discuss rural issues and opportunities, NRRN has hosted a number of forums and conferences.

=== 2005 ===
- Rural Immigration Think Tank (Brandon, Manitoba)
- CRRF-NRRN Annual Policy Conference (Gatineau, Quebec and Lankark County, Ontario)

=== 2006 ===
- CRRF-NRRN Annual Policy Conference (Twillingate, Newfoundland and Labrador)

=== 2007 ===
- CRRF-NRRN Annual Policy Conference (Vermilion, Alberta)

=== 2008 ===
- Northern Dialogue Session (Whitehorse, Yukon)
- CRRF-NRRN Annual Policy Conference (Inuvik, Northwest Territories)

== Governance ==
NRRN is governed Shirley Dawe (Western Economic Diversification Canada), Bill Reimer (Concordia University), David Douglas (University of Guelph), Robert Annis (Rural Development Institute, Brandon University), Ray Bollman (Statistics Canada), Mike Stolte (The CIEL), Kate Humpage (Rural Secretariat), Rob Greenwood (Harris Centre, Memorial University).
