= Royal Lake of the Woods Yacht Club =

Coordinates: 49°44′30″N 94°32′21″W

- Emblem

- Burgee

- Ensign
- Short name: RLWYC
- Founded: 1903
- Location: Yacht Club Island, Ontario, Canada
- Website: http://www.rlwyc.ca/

Club's special ensign until 1965.

Royal Lake of the Woods Yacht Club is a yacht club in Ontario, Canada. It is located on Yacht Club Island approximately 2 miles from Kenora, Ontario, on Lake of the Woods. The yacht club was founded in 1903.

== History ==
The first record of sailing on Lake of the Woods dates back to 1845, when the Hudson's Bay Company introduced York boats dawned with sails in order to transport their furs. The first camps were built on Keewatin Beach. For round twenty years, canoeing, rowing and sailing were the only means of transportation. The first motorboats were introduced in the late 1890s.

Keewatin Beach campers participated in sailing, rowing, and gymkhana events. By 1898, cruising races were run on McMillan Island. One of the earliest forms of these cruises was via the Keewatin Channel to Galt Island where the G.F Galt family hosted a picnic lunch. In 1903, sailboats became popular and motorized boats were introduced. A building was subsequently developed on McMillan Island and became the first clubhouse. George William Northwood designed the club house for Lake of the Woods Yacht Club in 1909

The first officers of the yacht club were: Commodore G.W. Baker, Vice Commodore W.E. Macara, Captain Fred Phillips, Measurer H.F. Forrest and Treasurer R.H. Mulock.

=== Royal Assent ===
In 1914, Prince Arthur and his daughter Princess Patricia visited the club. They suggested that it apply for the title of "Royal". The privilege was delayed because of World War I, but was later granted in 1925 with The Royal Lake of the Woods Yacht Club Incorporation Act. Commodore G.F. Galt was notified that King George V had granted the use of Royal to the Lake of the Woods Yacht Club.

== Past commodores ==
The following list of past commodores is published by the club on its official website.

Past commodores of the Royal Lake of the Woods Yacht Club
Term	Commodore	Term	Commodore
1903–1905	G.W. Baker	1906	T.A. Andersen
1907–1908	Montague Aldous	1909	G.F. Bryan
1910–1911	G.F. Galt	1912	T.L. Peters
1913	W.E. Macara	1914	F.L. Patton
1915–1918	Club closed	1919	W.K. Chandler
1920–1922	Sir Augustus Nanton	1923	R.M. Dennistoun
1924–1925	George F. Galt	1926	Douglas A. Clarke
1927	H.F. Osler	1928	H.D. Gooderham
1929–1930	E.A. Nanton	1931–1939	N.M. Paterson
1940–1946	G.E. Konantz	1947	John R. Morgan
1948	E.A. Nanton	1949	F.S. Holland
1950	W.C. Riley	1951	D.E. Kilgour
1952	E.R. Gardner	1953	A.K. Gage
1954	J.D. Graham	1955	H.W. Brown
1956	T.B. Ross	1957	A.S. Leach
1958	J.H. McDonald	1959	W.G. Konantz
1960	A.K. Stephens	1961	J.W. Dangerfield
1962	R.W. Richards	1963	G.E. Konantz
1964	T. Furgale	1965	J.M. Dowler
1966	J.A. Richardson	1967	D.S. Paterson
1968	E.B. Osler	1969	J.D. Riley
1970	G.E. Konantz II	1971	A.L. Goode
1972	J.H. McDonald	1973	R.W. Cunningham
1974	G.M. Savage	1975	R.H. Parkhill
1976	J.A. Banfield	1977	R. Brown
1978	E.J. Klassen	1979	J.H. Ashdown
1980	D.K. Graham	1981	L.H. Fyke
1982	H.A. Luckhurst	1983	J.A. Graham
1984	G.H. Evans	1985	S.F. Owen
1986	M.F.C. Radcliffe	1987	D.A. Forlong
1988	K.A. Powell	1989	B.A.J. Ormiston
1990	D.L. Gourley	1991	J.A. Richardson Jr.
1992	M.L. Napper	1993	A.C.H. Vivian
1994	K.A.F. McGarry	1995	H.S. Riley
1996	E.A. McLaughlin	1997	L.D. Hurst
1998	A.C. Smith	1999	T.A. Brousseau
2000	P.J. Donald	2001	C.C. Ferguson
2002	E.A. McLaughlin	2003	C.C. Ferguson and E.A. McLaughlin
2004	R.I. Kalinowsky	2005	R.I. Kalinowsky
2006	D.G. Konantz	2007	D.G. Konantz
2008	T.A. Parkhill	2009	R. Murray
2010	R. Murray	2011	R. Murray; H.S. Riley
2012	D.P. Rattray; H.S. Riley	2013	W.J.T. Banfield
2014	J.T. Stefanson	2015	M.E. Kristjansson
2016	Lisa Heimbecker	2017	Leney Richardson
2018	Bill Parrish	2019	A.G. Jones
2020	V.J. Newall	2021	F.M. Colegrave
2022	M.D.G. Wilson	2023	Catherine Konantz
2024	Andrew McLandress	2025	Karen Dunlop
2026	Drew Stephens		

== Notable Members ==
- Gordon Chown
- John Turner
- Heather Stefanson
- Kevin Kavanagh
