= Henry R. Kravis Prize in Nonprofit Leadership =

The Kravis Prize or Henry R. Kravis Prize in Nonprofit Leadership is a philanthropic award for leaders in the nonprofit sector. According to Bloomberg News, the prize "honor[s] those who have demonstrated 'bold leadership' in the nonprofit sector and have shared their best practices with others."

== About the Prize ==
The Henry R. Kravis Prize in Nonprofit Leadership was established in 2006. The recipient's achievements are celebrated at a ceremony in New York City and awarded $250,000. Collectively, the first five Prize recipients have impacted more than 500 million people in more than 60 countries on five continents.

The Prize is presented and administered by Claremont McKenna College, Marie-Josée and Henry R. Kravis. Marie-Josée Kravis is an economist and a senior fellow of the Hudson Institute. Henry Kravis, founding partner, co-chairman and co-CEO of Kohlberg Kravis Roberts & Co., is an alumnus and trustee of Claremont McKenna College. The Prize is affiliated with the Kravis Leadership Institute, a research institute within CMC.

The Kravis Prize builds public awareness of the recipients’ endeavors and aims to increase their credibility with other potential donors. Working together with Claremont McKenna College and the Kravis Leadership Institute, Kravis Prize recipients help shape the next generation of leaders in the nonprofit sector with:

- Annual lectures by Prize recipients to Claremont McKenna students, faculty and alumni;
- Summer internships that place Claremont McKenna students with the organizations of Prize recipients and allow students to lead a project for that organization;
- Case studies incorporated into the college's academic curricula, which feature the efforts of Prize recipients; and
- Research conducted by both faculty and students in the area of nonprofit impact.

== Recipients ==
- Endeavor (2015)
- Helen Keller International (2014)
- Right To Play (2013)
- Mothers2mothers and INJAZ Al-Arab (2012)
- Escuela Nueva (2011)

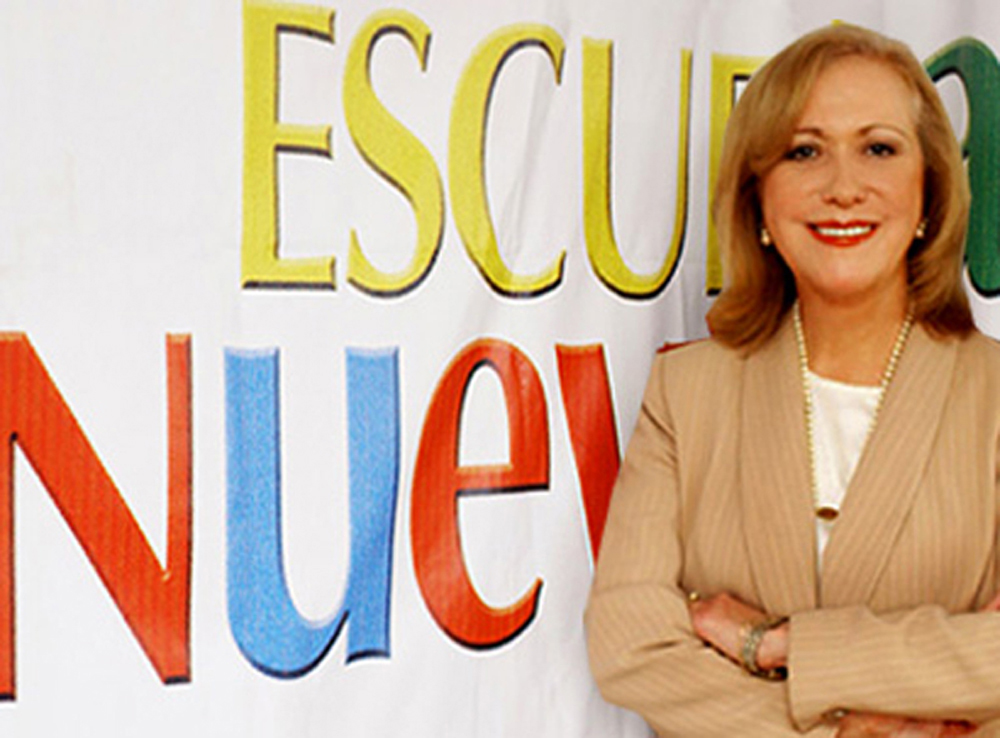
Vicky Colbert

Vicky Colbert founded the Escuela Nueva Foundation in 1987. Colbert and ENF work to alleviate inequality and poverty through a collaborative learning educational program in Colombia. The program provides effective teacher training, improves curriculum and fosters classroom environments that are engaging and compelling to students. The ENF model moves away from traditional "teacher-centered" environments, which often emphasize rote memorization directed by the teacher, and instead encourages "child-centered" environments that fully engage students and allow them to learn at their own pace.

=== Pratham (2010) ===
Pratham says it is the “largest non-governmental organization working to provide quality education to the underprivileged children of India. Pratham was established in 1994 to provide education to the children in the slums of Mumbai. Since then, the organization has grown both in scope and geographical coverage.”

=== Sakena Yacoobi (2009) ===
Sakena Yacoobi is the executive director of the Afghan Institute of Learning (AIL), an Afghan women-led non-governmental organization she founded in 1995. The AIL provides teacher training to Afghan women, supports education for boys and girls and provides health education to women and children.

=== F.A.W.E. (2008) ===
The Forum for African Women Educationalists (F.A.W.E.) is a “pan-African non-governmental organization working in 32 African countries to empower girls and women through gender-responsive education.” Through education of women and girls, F.A.W.E. improves livelihoods and enhances education and civil liberties.

=== Fazle Hasan Abed (2007) ===
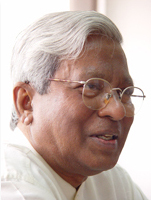
Fazle Abed

Sir Fazle Hasan Abed is a social worker and the founder and chairman of BRAC (Bangladesh Rural Advancement Committee), which uses education, health-care and microfinance programs to lift people out of poverty. A 2002 Bloomberg Businessweek article noted that most of BRAC's 110 million beneficiaries are women, and its centers operate schools that have helped “four million girls get at least five years of education.”

=== Roy Prosterman (2006) ===
Roy Prosterman is the founder of the Rural Development Institute (RDI) (which recently changed its name to Landesa) and is active in the fields of land reform, rural development and foreign aid. Prosterman is Professor Emeritus of Law at the University of Washington and is a frequent guest speaker at global forums on poverty alleviation.

== Selection Committee ==
The Kravis Prize is awarded annually based on nominations received from members of its Selection Committee and visitors to the Prize website. Nominations are considered by the committee and include a broad range of sectors in the nonprofit field, such as economic development, public health, law/justice/human rights, education and capacity building. According to the Kravis Prize website, the Selection Committee considers a nominee's boldness, innovation, creativity, consistency, persistence and effectiveness in implementing their vision. Other criteria include realizing the mission of an organization and demonstrating best practices.

Additionally, the Selection Committee considers the pool of nominees’ letters of recommendations, quantitative and qualitative analyses prepared by the Prize staff and the person's direct impact on the nonprofit sector.

The Kravis Prize Selection Committee is chaired by Marie-Josée Kravis, and also includes Banker Harry McMahon, Economist Amartya Sen, Financier Lord Jacob Rothschild, Ratan Tata, Surin Pitsuwan and James D. Wolfensohn.

== Best practice ==
The prize aims to identify institutions that delivered their services efficiently and share best practices with other nonprofit groups. The work of Roy Prosterman and the Rural Development Institute, the first recipient of the Kravis Prize, has become a case study at the Stanford Business School for how it addressed rural landlessness in India.

Case studies include:

- Rural Development Institute, “Curbing Mission Creep,” Winter 2008. "Despite temptations to broaden its focus, the Rural Development Institute has remained single-mindedly devoted to its mission. As a result, the organization has helped 400 million poor farmers around the world take ownership of some" 270 million acres (1,100,000 km^{2}) "of land – all on a modest budget."
- BRAC, “In the Black with BRAC,” Winter 2009. “Serving more than 110 million people per year, BRAC is the largest nonprofit in the world. Yet it doesn’t receive the most charitable donations. Instead, BRAC’s social enterprises generate 80 percent of the organization’s annual budget. These revenues have allowed the organization to develop, test, and replicate some of the world’s most innovative antipoverty programs.”
- Forum for African Women Educationalists, “Strength Through Flexibility,” Winter 2010. “Development experts have long known that educating girls is one of the surest ways to improve life for everyone in poor countries. Yet the path to school has not been smooth for many girls—especially in sub-Saharan Africa. Over the past 17 years, however, the Forum for African Women Educationalists (FAWE) has delivered high-quality education to millions of girls across 35 African countries. The secret to FAWE’s scale and impact, say its leaders, is its flexibility.”

The Prize also seeks to add to the work already in progress at the Kravis Leadership Institute at Claremont McKenna College.
