= 2008 Manitoba electoral redistribution =

Coordinates: 53°N 97°W

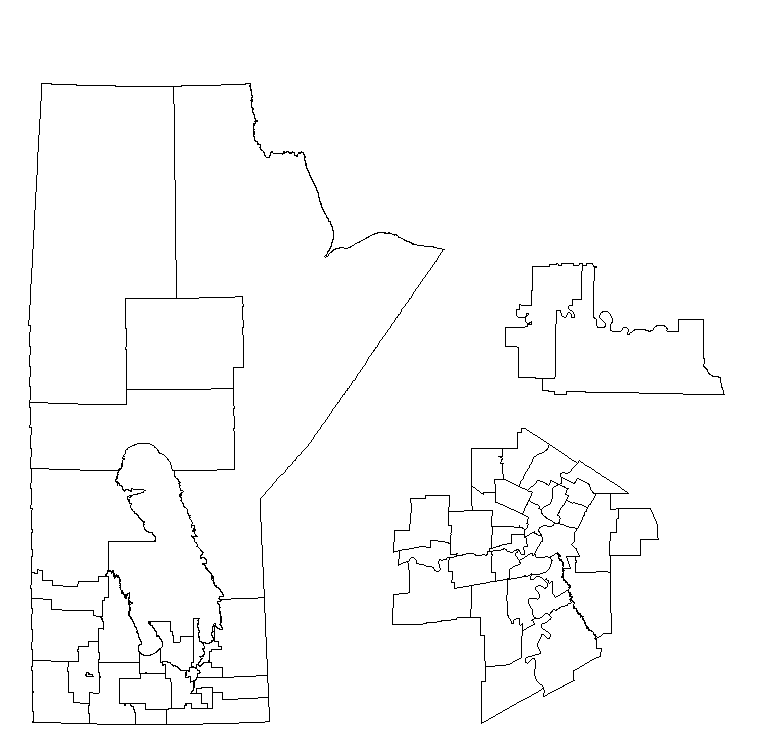
Previous Boundaries

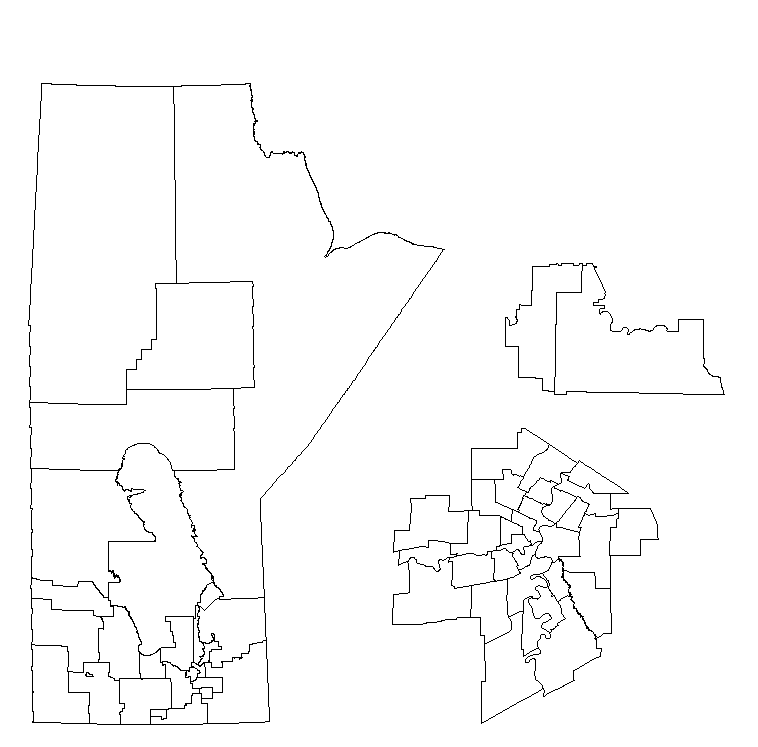
New Boundaries

The Manitoba electoral redistribution of 2008 started on April 14, 2008 when Manitoba's Electoral Divisions Boundaries Commission made up of Manitoba Chief Justice Richard J. Scott, Chief Electoral Officer Richard D. Balasko, President and Vice-Chancellor of the University College of the North Denise K. Henning, Dean of the Faculty of Arts and Professor of Political Studies at the University of Manitoba Richard Sigurdson, and President and Vice-Chancellor at Brandon University Louis Visentin released the population counts of the 1998 electoral boundaries based on Census 2006 population counts provided by Statistics Canada. The Pas was the only riding not to have its boundaries changed. The Electoral Divisions Boundaries Commission released its report after months of public consultation and deliberation.

The new boundaries first took effect in the 2011 election of the Manitoba Legislature.

== New ridings ==
- Agassiz
- Dauphin
- Dawson Trail
- Fort Garry-Riverview
- Fort Richmond
- Kewatinook
- Logan
- Midland
- Morden-Winkler
- Riding Mountain
- Spruce Woods
- St. Paul
- Tyndall Park
