= Land reform in South Vietnam =

Land reform in South Vietnam refers to the land redistribution implemented in South Vietnam. Seeking to undermine the popularity of the communist-led Viet Minh's policies of land reform which gave lands to poor peasants, the government of South Vietnam implemented their own land-redistribution policies during the Vietnam War.

Before division, Vietnamese emperor Bao Dai in 1953 responded to the Viet Minh program of land redistribution and rent reduction with a decree declaring that rents for land should not exceed 15 percent of the crop. Early reforms enacted by the South Vietnamese government after the division in the 1950s largely failed, as the ordinances prescribed by the government often attempted to directly undo the already-popular land reforms of the Việt Minh, requiring poor peasants to pay to acquire land that the communists had already given to them. During the 1960s, such programs were rendered defunct and unenforceable due to the South Vietnamese army's inability to control farmland territories against the Viet Cong.

In the 1970s, South Vietnam implemented the "Land to the Tiller" reform with the aid of the United States. This program was more successful than earlier programs, and was almost entirely underwritten by the United States. The reform program was discontinued in 1975 following South Vietnam's defeat in the Vietnam War and the unification of Vietnam in 1976, which had renamed Saigon as "Ho Chi Minh City" to honor the leader of the Communist Party who declared the country's independence from France after World War II as the August General Uprising against not just the French, but also the Japanese who invaded Indochina back in 1940.

Following the unification, the government of Vietnam attempted to carry out further land reform in the southern part of the country in order to develop its transformation to a socialist economy. This attempt at reform was met with difficulties, and did not achieve its goals.

== Background ==
Following World War II, the communist Việt Minh (the predecessor of Viet Cong) fought against the French colonialists and their local supporters (mainly landowners) in the First Indochina War. At the time, a large percentage of agricultural land was owned by powerful landowners and the majority of the rural population of Vietnam owned only small plots of land (with little legal assurance) or were simply landless peasants. The early success of the land reform program under the Viet Minh gave the communists a strong base of support among the 80% of the Vietnamese people who lived in rural areas.

Prior to the provisional separation of North and South Vietnam, emperor Bao Dai in 1953 responded to the Viet Minh program of land redistribution and rent reduction with a decree declaring that rents for land should not exceed 15 percent of the crop. The decree was unenforceable and rendered null by a failing colonial government and, in any case, contained loopholes that could have been exploited by landlords.

From 1954 to 1975 land reform in Vietnam was pursued on two separate channels and regions as the country was provisionally divided into two parts: South Vietnam (The Republic of Vietnam) and North Vietnam (the Democratic Republic of Vietnam), resembling the current partition of Korea. Communist North Vietnam and its southern proxies, the Viet Cong, adopted a policy of confiscating the land of landlords and rich peasants by force and redistributing it to poor and landless peasants, thus organizing the rural population into collectives.

== Land reform during the Vietnam War ==
Capitalist South Vietnam failed in several land reform endeavors before finally achieving some success with the "Land to the Tiller" program in the early 1970s that was almost fully devised and supported by the United States, which considered it to be part of their policy of the Vietnamization of the war.

=== Early land reform ordinances ===
In 1954, South Vietnam's ally, the United States, advised the new government of South Vietnam, headed by Ngo Dinh Diem, to undertake "indispensable reforms" including land reform. In response on 8 January 1955, Diem adopted Ordinance No. 2, which capped rental of land at 25 percent of production. In October 1956, Diem adopted Ordinance No. 57 which forbade ownership by an individual of more than 100 hectares (250 acres) of rice land and prescribed the conditions and terms under which the excess land expropriated from the rich could be transferred to landless less-wealthy farmers. The U.S. would pay the landowners and receive payment from the purchasers over a 6-year period. The U.S. believed land reform was important for building support for the government and threatened to cut aid unless land reform and other changes were made. Under the program the government acquired 422,000 hectares (1,040,000 acres) from 1958 to 1961 and distributed 244,000 hectares (600,000 acres). The land redistributed thus comprised less than 10 percent of the 7.5 million acres of cultivated land in South Vietnam.

The land reform program implemented under Ordinance 57 was unpopular in the countryside. The Viet Minh had already divided up the land -- "fairly," in the words of one official. The government's program was less generous to the majority of farmers than had been the Viet Minh redistribution of land in areas which it controlled. The amount of land that individuals were permitted to retain was large, farmers were required to pay for land they acquired under the program, and the program was riddled with corruption and inefficiency. Many rural people believed that the United States army and the government of South Vietnam were on the side of the landlords. Military operations by the U.S. and South Vietnamese armies to clear communist insurgents from an area would often result in landlords reclaiming land previously abandoned or confiscated and redistributed by the Viet Minh or Viet Cong.

Support for the Vietcong was driven by resentment of Diem's reversal of Viet Minh land reforms in the countryside. The Viet Minh had confiscated large private landholdings, reduced rents and debts, and leased communal lands, mostly to poorer peasants. Diem brought the landlords back, people who had been farming land for years had to return it to landlords and pay years of back rent. Marilyn B. Young wrote that "The divisions within villages reproduced those that had existed against the French: 75% support for the NLF, 20% trying to remain neutral and only 5% firmly pro-Saigon government".

Ordinance 57 resulted in the reverse of what was the objective of land reform advocates: large landowners and landlords increased their influence, especially in the important rice-growing area of the Mekong Delta. The ordinance remained in effect until 1970, but was largely unutilized after 1960 as the Viet Cong insurgents took control or disputed government control of most of the rural areas of South Vietnam.

=== Land to the Tiller ===
The Land to the Tiller project carried out in Vietnam from 1970 to 1973 was based on a proposal by Roy Prosterman, a prominent American "land-rights activist", who the US government of the time recruited within its efforts against Viet Cong in South Vietnam. Drawing on experiences in other countries (particularly in Latin America), Prosterman proposed a "land-to-the-tiller" program to compete with the Viet Cong for the allegiance of the peasants. The plan mimicked the communists' land expropriation strategy, coupled with monetary compensation to the former landowners.

On 26 March 1970, with the war still underway, the government of South Vietnam began implementation of the Land-to-the-Tiller program following Prosterman's model. In total, the United States financed 339 million US dollars of the reform's 441 million dollars of expenses. Individual holdings were limited to 15 hectares. Legal titles were extended to peasants in areas under control of the South Vietnamese government to whom land had previously been distributed by the Viet Cong.

=== Analysis ===
Bernard B. Fall a prominent war correspondent, historian, political scientist, and expert on Indochina during the 1950s and 1960s, claimed that delayed land reform in South Vietnam had played such a fundamental role in the Vietnam War that it was as important as "ammunition for howitzers." South Vietnam's ally and financial supporter, the United States, either failed to realise the importance of land reform in a timely fashion or was not able to persuade the South Vietnamese government of its importance. Andrew Biggs, at researcher at the University of Washington argues that the "Land to the Tiller" program of the early 1970s was too little, too late to swing the war in the favour of the US.

In the words of an American official, Robert Samson "The Americans (lost the war because) they offered the peasant a constitution; the Viet Cong offered him his land and with it the right to survive".

== Land reform in southern Vietnam after reunification ==
According to Trung Dinh Dang, a scholar at the Cornell School of Government and Politics Of Asia and The Pacific, the Vietnamese Communist Party struggled to carry out the socialist transformation of agriculture in the south of Vietnam following the unification of the country. The contemporary party leaders initially considered land reform initiatives to be a temporary measure toward mass collectivisation.

== See also ==
- Land reform
- Land reform in Vietnam
