= Robert C. Annis =

Canadian academic

Robert C. Annis is the Director of the Rural Development Institute, and an Associate Professor of Rural Development, at Brandon University. Annis is engaged in many community-based development organizations and research activities. He is vice chair of the Canadian Consortium of Health Promotion Research, board member with the National Rural Research Network, past chairperson of the Board of Community Futures Partners of Manitoba, chairperson of the Board of Wheat Belt Community Futures, co-chair for Pan West Community Futures Network of Western Canada.

Annis received his doctorate in psychology from the Caledonian University. In March 2008, Annis was appointed to the Manitoba Immigration Council by Nancy Allan, Minister of Immigration and Labour.
