= Land reform in Vietnam =

History of land reformation in Vietnam

Land reform in Vietnam (Vietnamese: Cải cách ruộng đất, IPA: [kâj kǎʲk ʐuə̂ˀŋ ɗʌ̌k]) began in the political turmoil following World War II. In 1945, Vietnam gained their independence from Japanese occupation and overthrew the monarchical rule of the Nguyễn dynasty.

However, the newly independent nation faced the horrendous aftermath of the Vietnamese famine of 1944–1945 in which 2 million people starved to death from mismanagement during the war.

The Viet Minh then went on to wage a protracted war against the French Union. At that time a large percentage of agricultural land was owned by large landowners and the majority of the rural population were landless. The early success of the land reform programs of the communist-led Viet Minh (and their successors, the National Liberation Front), gave the communists revolutionaries a strong base of support among the 80 percent of the Vietnamese people who lived in the rural countryside. This was an important factor in determining the outcome of the Vietnam War.

From 1954 to 1975 land reform was on two separate tracks as the country was provisionally divided into two parts: South Vietnam (the Republic of Vietnam) and North Vietnam (the Democratic Republic of Vietnam). Communist North Vietnam and its directed southern insurgency, the NLF, adopted a policy of confiscating the land of landlords and rich peasants and distributing it to poor and landless peasants and later organizing the rural population into collectives. Capitalistic South Vietnam failed in several land reform endeavors before finally achieving some success with the "Land to the Tiller" program in the early 1970s. The collapse of the South Vietnamese government in 1975 ended that program.

Vietnam expert Bernard Fall said land reform in South Vietnam was as essential to success in the Vietnam War as "ammunition for howitzers". South Vietnam's ally and financial supporter, the United States, either failed to realize the importance of land reform or failed to persuade the South Vietnamese government of its importance. In the words of an American official, "The Americans offered the peasant a constitution; the Viet Cong offered him his land and with it the right to survive."

Land reform in North Vietnam was accomplished from 1954 to 1956 by confiscating and redistributing land owned by landlords to poor and landless peasants. This program resulted in the executions of "landlords and reactionaries", estimated to have killed 13,500 people, and resistance, including rioting, in the countryside. The North Vietnamese government apologized for the excesses and attempted to rectify errors. The communist government of North Vietnam (and after 1975 all of Vietnam) followed up land redistribution by establishing collective farms, but collectivized agriculture failed to result in large gains in agriculture production. Collectives were abandoned after 1988 and agricultural production rose rapidly thereafter.

== Precolonial Vietnam ==
There were two types of land ownership in precolonial Vietnam: Private ownership (this land could be traded freely) and state ownership (this land was primarily assigned to landless peasants for cultivation). These two types of land ownerships were taxed at the same rates.

The historical precolonial state regularly seized privately owned land and assigned it to landless peasants under a state owned system. Such land equalization programs (phép quân điền) have been documented since the 11th century. A well-documented land equalization program was conducted in Binh Dinh Province in 1839.

The Nguyen Dynasty carried out a land registry to establish formal land ownership across Vietnam over the period 1805–1836. The Vietnamese state raised its revenue primarily from agricultural land taxes and head taxes, which necessitated accurate surveys of land holding and effective censuses of adult males. Private owners of land had incentives to hide landless farmers who were in their employ in order to evade taxes. However, peasants under the state ownership system were incentivized to make themselves known in order to not lose cultivation rights.

== French rule ==
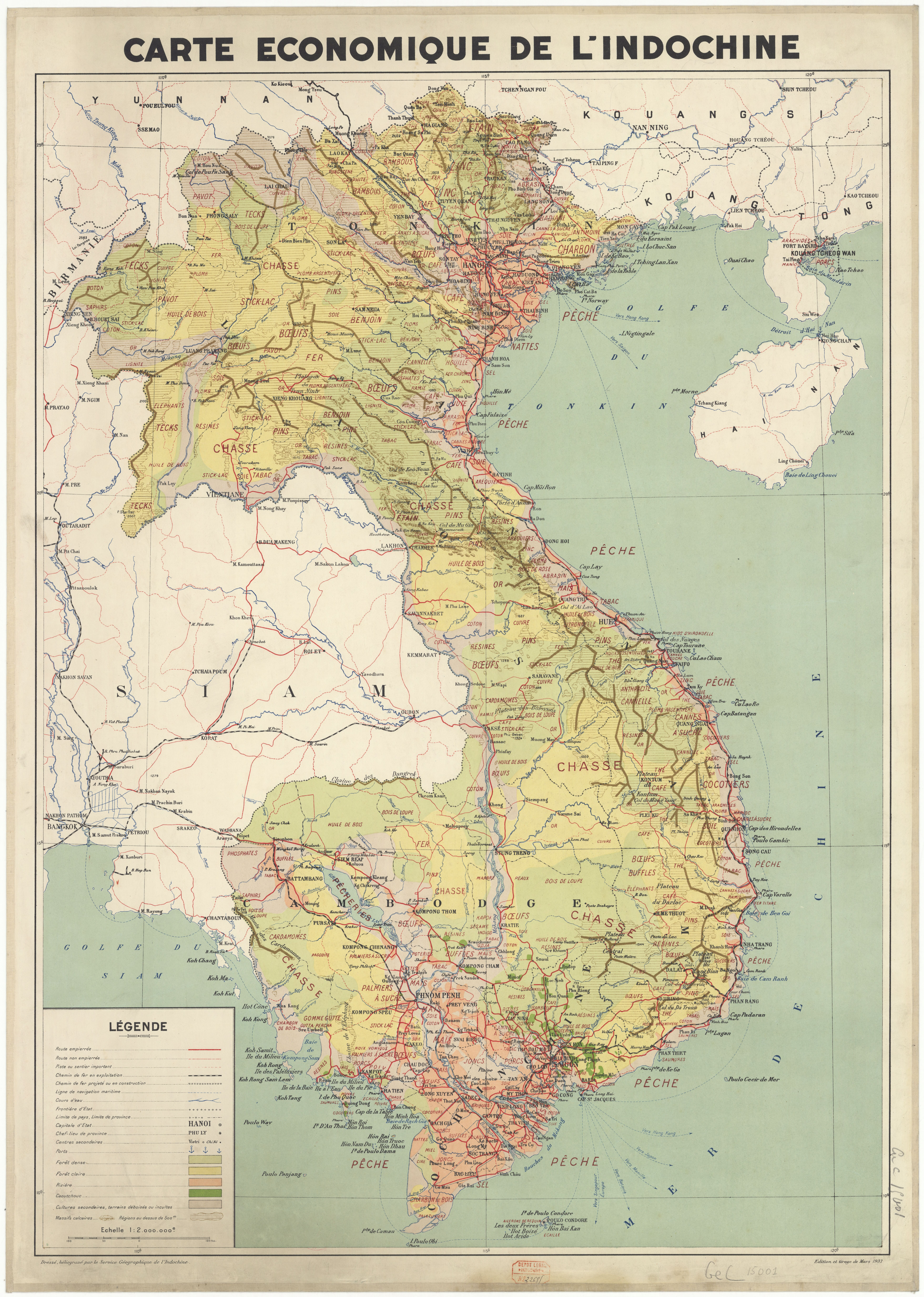
Economic map of French Indochina

During the period of French rule of Indochina (1887-1954) Vietnam consisted of three regions: Tonkin—the rice-growing area of the Red River valley of northern Vietnam; Cochinchina—the rice-growing area of the Mekong Delta of southern Vietnam; and Annam—the connective between the two regions (aka Central Vietnam), consisting of a narrow coastal plain and highlands. Tonkin and Annam had difficulty growing enough rice to feed their population and often imported rice from Cochinchina which produced a surplus.

Under French rule, French citizens and Vietnamese allies were granted large tracts of land, confiscated or obtained in some manner from its traditional occupants and owners. In southern Vietnam, the production of industrial crops for export, notably rubber, began on a large scale. Vietnam was managed by the French primarily to produce revenue which was attained by exports, taxation and government monopolies. By the 1930s, one result of French economic exploitation was a serious problem of unequal land distribution. Approximately 80 percent of the population of Vietnam was rural and depended upon agriculture for a livelihood. About one million families/households—40 percent of the rural population of southern Vietnam—were landless tenants. In northern Vietnam about 21 percent of the rural population was landless and another 35 percent owned only very small parcels of land. Out of a total population of Vietnam of around 25 million in 1940, 8 million people were probably landless peasants. The country's richest agriculture region, the Mekong delta, was considered one of the five worst areas in the world for the prevalence of landlessness and tenancy among its inhabitants.

For the more than 70 percent of the population in the Mekong Delta who were landless or rented land to supplement their small holding, "Rentals were as heavy as any to be found in Asia -- 50 percent of the crop. The tenant had to provide his own hut, tools, and livestock, and hire supplementary labor at the height of the season.... By the time the tenant had discharged all his obligations, his share of the crop was roughly a third of the total."

== Viet Minh ==
The Viet Minh—a communist Vietnamese independence movement—fought to gain independence from France in the First Indochina War. They were the dominant political force in many of the rural areas of Vietnam, especially in the north where the French presence was less than in the south. In 1948, the Viet Minh initiated a modest program of reducing the rent peasants paid to landlords, although they were careful not to offend large landowners and landlords who supported the revolution. The Viet Minh confiscated land owned by French nationals, "traitors", and landlords who fled to the cities to avoid the war in rural areas. The redistributed land was allocated to poor and landless peasants, but the Viet Minh retained control of the ownership of the land. Scholar Jeffrey Race, who did a grassroots study of the people in one Mekong Delta province, said that "no other [Communist] Party activities had such an immediate and profound impact...the promise of land being one of the principal means of obtaining a core of activists in each village to drive out the government authorities."

According to an official report by Trường Chinh, there were more than 5 million hectares of land used for growing rice and other food crops in Vietnam, of which 9% was seized by the French colonialists, 10.2% was communal or semi-communal/semi-private, 1% was owned by the Catholic Church, nearly 50% by Vietnamese landlords, and about 30% by farmers. In 1953, the Viet Minh, now in control of 60 to 90 percent of the rural areas of Vietnam, took a bolder approach to expand the land redistribution programs in what was called the rectification movement according to the model and instructions of China. They continued the rectification movement in the North after Vietnam was provisionally divided at the 17th parallel as a result of the Geneva Accord of 1954. The land reforms carried out in North and South Vietnam bifurcate after 1954. Vietnamese emperor Bao Dai in 1953 responded to the Viet Minh program of land redistribution and rent reduction with a decree declaring that rents for land should not exceed 15 percent of the crop.

== North Vietnam ==
Land tenure situation in North Vietnam—1953
Incomplete data; totals do not add to 100%; households consist of an average of more than 5 persons.	Households (% of total)	Land owned (% of total)	Land owned per person (ha)
French and Catholic Church	0.0%	1.6 %	not applicable
Landlords	1.8%	17.3%	1.009 hectares (2.49 acres)
Rich peasants	1.2%	4.4%	.398 hectares (0.98 acres)
Middle peasants	33.6%	34.6%	.137 hectares (0.34 acres)
Poor peasants	43.5%	15.7%	.043 hectares (0.11 acres)
Laborers	19.8%	1.9%	.016 hectares (0.040 acres)
Communal land	not applicable	25.0%	not applicable

The rectification campaign begun by the Viet Minh revolutionaries continued under the communist government of North Vietnam from 1954 to 1956. In characteristic communist fashion, the government divided the farmers into social classes: landlords, rich peasants, middle peasants, poor peasants, and landless or nearly landless laborers. In North Vietnam about one-fourth of agricultural land was owned communally and allocated by the village or hamlet leaders to individual farmers.

The Land Reform Law of 4 December 1953 called for (1) confiscation of land belonging to landlords who were enemies of the regime; (2) requisition of land from landlords not judged to be enemies; and (3) purchase with payment in bonds. The land reform was carried out from 1953 to 1956 in five "waves," each larger than the previous one and extending to most of the good agricultural land of North Vietnam. Some farming areas did not undergo land reform but only rent reduction and the highland areas occupied by minority peoples were not substantially impacted. Some land was retained by the government but most was distributed without payment with priority given to Viet Minh fighters and their families.

The total number of rural people impacted by the land reform program was more than 4 million. The rent reduction program impacted nearly 8 million people. North Vietnam had a total population of approximately 15 million people in 1955.

The land reform program was a success in terms of distributing much land to poor and landless peasants and reducing or eliminating the land holdings of landlords (địa chủ) and rich peasants. By 1960, there were 40,000 cooperatives spanning nearly nine-tenths of all farmland. The program, proceeded by a Three Year Plan (1957-1960), lifted agricultural production to 5.4 million tonnes or over double pre-Indochina War levels.

However, it was carried out with violence and repression primarily directed against large landowners identified, sometimes incorrectly, as landlords. Executions and imprisonment of persons classified as "reactionary and evil landlords" were contemplated from the beginning of the land reform program. The number of persons actually executed by cadre carrying out the land reform program has been variously estimated, with some ranging up to 200,000. However, other scholarship has concluded that the higher estimates were significantly exaggerated and based on South Vietnamese propaganda with US support. Scholar Balasz Szalontai wrote that documents of Hungarian diplomats living in North Vietnam at the time of the land reform provided a minimum number of 1,337 executions. Concurrently with the land reform campaign and the end of the First Indochina War, over 12,000 people starved to death in Viet-Minh controlled zones by the end of 1954 due to economic turmoil in combination with natural disasters, floods, and crop failures. Gareth Porter estimated between 800 and 2,500 executions and cited a South Vietnamese government document released in 1959 he says is consistent with an estimate of around 1,500 executions. Economist Vo Nhan Tri reported uncovering a document in the Vietnamese central party archives which put the number of executions at 15,000. From discussions with party cadres, Vo Nhan Tri concluded that the overall number of deaths was considerably higher than this figure. Scholar Edwin E. Moïse estimated the total number of executions at between 3,000 and 15,000 and later came up with a more precise figure of 13,500.

In early 1956, North Vietnam initiated a "correction of errors" which put an end to the land reform, and to rectify the mistakes and damage done. On 18 August 1956, North Vietnamese leader Ho Chi Minh apologised and acknowledged the serious errors the government had made in the land reform. Too many farmers, he also said, had been incorrectly classified as "landlords" and executed or imprisoned and too many mistakes has been made in the process of redistributing land. Severe rioting protesting the excesses of the land reform broke out in November 1956 in one largely Catholic rural district, leading to 1,000 deaths or injuries, and several thousand imprisoned. As part of the correction campaign, as many as 23,748 political prisoners were released by North Vietnam by September 1957. By 1958, the correction campaign had resulted in the return of land to many of those harmed by the land reform.

== South Vietnam ==
Landlords and rich peasants owned a greater percentage of land in South Vietnam, especially in the rich agricultural land of the Mekong Delta, than in North Vietnam. Prior to the provisional separation of North and South Vietnam, emperor Bao Dai in 1953 responded to the Viet Minh program of land redistribution and rent reduction with a decree declaring that rents for land should not exceed 15 percent of the crop. The decree was unenforceable and rendered null by a failing colonial government and, in any case, contained loopholes that could have been exploited by landlords.

In 1954, South Vietnam's ally, the United States, advised the new government of South Vietnam, headed by Ngo Dinh Diem, to undertake "indispensable reforms" including land reform. In response on 8 January 1955, Diem adopted Ordinance No. 2, which capped rental of land at 25 percent of production. In October 1956, Diem adopted Ordinance No. 57 which forbade ownership by an individual of more than 100 hectares (250 acres) of rice land and prescribed the conditions and terms under which the excess land expropriated from the rich could be transferred to landless less-wealthy farmers. The U.S. would pay the landowners and receive payment from the purchasers over a 6-year period. The U.S. believed land reform was important for building support for the government and threatened to cut aid unless land reform and other changes were made. Under the program the government acquired 422,000 hectares (1,040,000 acres) from 1958 to 1961 and distributed 244,000 hectares (600,000 acres). The land redistributed thus comprised less than 10 percent of the 7.5 million acres of cultivated land in South Vietnam.

The land reform program implemented under Ordinance 57 was unpopular in the countryside. The Viet Minh had already divided up the land -- "fairly," in the words of one official. The government's program was less generous to the majority of farmers than had been the Viet Minh redistribution of land in areas which it controlled. The amount of land that individuals were permitted to retain was large, farmers were required to pay for land they acquired under the program, and the program was riddled with corruption and inefficiency. Many rural people believed that the United States army and the government of South Vietnam were on the side of the landlords. Military operations by the U.S. and South Vietnamese armies to clear communist insurgents from an area would often result in landlords reclaiming land previously abandoned or confiscated and redistributed by the Viet Minh or Viet Cong.

Ordinance 57 resulted in the reverse of what was the objective of land reform advocates: large landowners and landlords increased their influence, especially in the important rice-growing area of the Mekong Delta. The ordinance remained in effect until 1970, but was largely unutilized after 1960 as the Viet Cong insurgents took control or disputed government control of most of the rural areas of South Vietnam.

Land-to-the-Tiller. In 1967, land reform expert Roy Prosterman revived the idea of land reform in South Vietnam. Drawing on experience in other countries, Prosterman proposed a "land-to-the-tiller" program to compete "with the Viet Cong for the allegiance of the peasants." The plan had two main features: (1) all agricultural land in South Vietnam was to be owned by the farmers actually tilling the land, including land previously distributed by the Viet Cong and (2) landlords would be compensated fully for the land taken from them with payment guaranteed by the United States. Prosterman estimated that the land-to-the-tiller program could be accomplished at a cost of $900 million—less than the Vietnam War was costing the United States each month.

On 26 March 1970, with the Vietnam War still underway, the government of South Vietnam began implementation of the Land-to-the-Tiller program, similar to what Prosterman had proposed. The reform aimed to expropriate land from landlords not personally cultivating the land and giving it to tenant farmers; the landlords were compensated. Individual land holding was limited to 15 hectares. Legal title was extended to peasants who lived in areas under control of the South Vietnamese government to whom land had previously been given by the North Vietnamese-ruled Viet Cong.

U.S.President Richard Nixon gave his support to new land reform measures in June 1969 in the Midway communiqué, judging it favorable to the vietnamization of the conflict. In total, the United States financed $339 million of the total $441 million the reform cost.

"By all accounts, the program was highly successful," in the words of one scholar. By the end of 1973, 953,000 land titles had been distributed to poor or landless farmers and 1,198,000 hectares of land—nearly 40 percent of cultivated land in South Vietnam—had been distributed. By the end of the Vietnam War in 1975, the U.S. estimated that land tenancy had practically disappeared in South Vietnam and that the living standard of farmers had increased by 30 to 50 percent. However, the Land-to-the-Tiller program "failed to have a decisive impact [on the Vietnam War] because it was too little, too late."

== Collective farming ==
The ultimate objective of the land reform program of the North Vietnamese government, which became the government of all Vietnam in 1975, was not to achieve equitable distribution of farmland but rather the organization of all farmers into co-operatives in which land and other factors of agricultural production would be owned and used collectively. Farmers to whom land given in the land reform program did not receive title to the land. The ultimate ownership of the land remained with the State.

The first steps after the 1953-1956 land reform were the encouragement by the government of labor exchanges in which farmers would unite to exchange labor; secondly in 1958 and 1959 was the formation of "low level cooperatives" in which farmers cooperated in production. By 1961, 86 percent of farmers were members of low-level cooperatives. The third step beginning in 1961 was to organize "high level cooperatives", true collective farming in which land and resources were utilized collectively without individual ownership of land. Workers received points for the quality and quantity of work they performed and the points accumulated were used to compute the share each member received of the cooperative's profit or production. This point system deteriorated into a system in which shares were computed only on the basis of hours worked, with no benefit accruing to farmers on the basis of the quality of their work.

By 1971, the great majority of farmers in North Vietnam were organized into high-level cooperatives. In former South Vietnam after 1975, however, the collectivization movement was much slower to be implemented. By 1986, more than 90 percent of farmers in former North Vietnam were organized into cooperatives; by contrast only 5. 9 percent of farmers in the Mekong Delta (Vietnam's "rice bowl") of former South Vietnam were members of cooperatives. Redistribution of land, begun under the South Vietnamese government, continued with each adult receiving 0.1 to 0.15 hectares and each minor child or elder person receiving .08 to .1 hectare of land. Collectivization efforts notwithstanding, the family farm remained the basis of agriculture in the Mekong Delta.

== Abolishment of collective farms ==
Rice production per capita under collectivization remained stagnant in northern Vietnam and declined in southern Vietnam. This decline was attributed by scholars to uncertainty and opposition to the attempted collectivization of the South. Rice production usually comprises more than 90 percent of total grain production in Vietnam and in 1978 rice production bottomed out at 9,790,000 metric tons.

Reform of the collective farm system began in 1981 in which farmers were permitted to sell their agricultural production after meeting a required level of output for the state. This was a shift from a fixed wage system to a fixed rent system of production. Although initially production of rice and other crops increased as a result, the government still controlled the distribution of inputs and dictated land use and crop choices. In 1988, to further stimulate agricultural production, the government adopted Resolution 10, which ended most characteristics of the collective farm system. Regulation 10 enabled farmers to lease land from the government for up to 20 years, thus providing security of tenure.

In 1993, the government further liberalized the agricultural sector with the adoption of the Land Law which gave land holders the rights of "exchange, transfer, inheritance, lease, and mortgage" of their leased land. The reforms were successful. Rice production in Vietnam rose from 15,103,000 metric tons in 1987 to 32,554,000 metric tons in 2000. In 1989, Vietnam became a net exporter of rice and later became one of the largest rice exporters in the world.
