= Vassar, Manitoba =

Unincorporated community in Manitoba, Canada

Coordinates: 49°05′52″N 95°49′53″W

Vassar is a community located in southeastern Manitoba. It is located in the Rural Municipality of Piney, approximately 5 km (3.1 mi) north of the Canada–United States border with Minnesota.

== History ==
Vassar's first inhabitants settled in 1896 with the railroad's arrival. Vassar was named after Sir William Mackenzie's (a key figure in Canada's railway expansion) sister-in-law, Rosanna (Rose) Vassar, who had married Sir William's brother, Alexander.

The first store, post office, and school were all built in the early 1900s. A hotel was built in the late 1920s and parts of that building are incorporated into a current motel.

== Notable people ==
- Marjorie Beaucage (born 1947), Métis filmmaker
