= John Everett Robbins =

Canadian educator (1903–1995)

- Born: October 9, 1903; Hampton, Ontario
- Died: March 7, 1995 (aged 91); Regina, Saskatchewan
- Education: B.A. University of Manitoba, 1928; M.A. University of Manitoba, 1929; Ph.D University of Ottawa

1st Canadian Ambassador to The Holy See
- In office April 23, 1970 – October 20, 1973
- Succeeded by: Paul Tremblay

John Everett Robbins (9 October 1903 – 7 March 1995) was a Canadian educator and encyclopedia editor. He served as the director of the Dominion Bureau of Statistics and helped found Carleton College. Robbins was a former President of Brandon University and the first Canadian Ambassador to the Holy See.

== Early life and education ==
Robbins was born on 9 October 1903 in Hampton, Darlington county, Ontario, Canada to John and Gertrude May Robbins. The family moved to the southern Manitoba village of Darlingford in 1906 with the hope that the change in climate would help John senior's health but in 1912 they had to return to Ontario and John's father died in early 1913.

Gertrude Robbins, now with three children to support, married William C. White, a widowed farmer the Robbins family met during their time in Darlingford. With the family moves and the need for help on the farm through world war one John's education suffered many interruptions, however, he did well in his studies. Robbins read many of the classic books White kept in his library in the house, and he found many books by Canadian authors on the shelves of the Methodist Sunday School. Robbins eventually completed grade eleven and took an elementary school teaching job in Saskatchewan where his uncle, Everett Brown, was a school inspector. After working at a few rural schools in Saskatchewan he became convinced that he needed to attain a university degree. He returned to Manitoba and completed grade twelve at Melita, the only rural Manitoba school offering this grade for university entrance. From 1923-1925 he taught in Punnichy, Saskatchewan to raise funds for university, completing some undergraduate credits extramurally.

At the University of Manitoba Robbins set his sights on a master's degree, completed his bachelor of arts in 1928. Upon completing his B.A. he then wanted to earn a Phd. In 1929 he completed the master's degree, majoring in economics and minor in political science and a thesis titled, "A study of the revenue system of the Dominion of Canada." He applied for and received a scholarship for a Phd in the Department of Economics at McMaster University in Toronto, Ontario.

== Dominion Bureau of Statistics ==
In 1930, after publishing several successful papers, he received an offer of a position in the Educational Division of the Dominion Bureau of Statistics in Ottawa, Ontario. Arriving in Ottawa he found a boarding house not far from the offices and there he met a young D.B.S. employee named Catherine Saint-Denis. He immediately began serving at the D.B.S., becoming its director from 1936 to 1952. Robbins married Catherine during their time at D.B.S. and they had two children, Bernard and Emmett.

== Canadian Councils ==
Robbins was a co-founder of several artistic, cultural and educational societies. He also worked as a director of some of these councils.

- The Canadian Association for Adult Education,
- the Canadian Library Association,
- the Social Science and Humanities Research Councils and
- the Canadian Writers' Foundation.

In 1941 while employed at the Dominion Bureau of Statistics Robbins, a proponent of a creating a non-Catholic college in Ottawa, has a role in founding Carleton University first as a board member on the College Grade Education Committee and later on the Executive Committee of the Board of Governors.

== Encyclopedia Canadiana ==
He spent a year working as Director of Education for the United Nations Relief and Works Agency for Palestinian Refugees in the Middle East (UNRWA). Upon returning to Ottawa in 1952 he found he was uninspired to continue working at the D.B.S. A short time after his return the President of the Grolier Society of Canada, A.E. McBride, paid him a visit looking for advice on candidates for editor in chief of an Encyclopedia of Canada. A project McBride had been promoting unsuccessfully for several years. Eventually, he convinced Robbins to accept the position and the new Encyclopedia Canadiana was published in 1957.

== Brandon College and Brandon University ==
Dr. J.R.C. Evans, president of Brandon College, died and a former classmate of Robbins was the Vice-Chairman of the board, Milt Holden. Milt called on Robbins and offered him the presidency which he accepted as of January 1961. During his tenure the college became an independent university in 1967. Robbins resigned in 1969. Brandon University commemorated him by naming the library after him.

== Ambassador to the Holy See ==
In 1969 Robbins was appointed Canada's first ambassador to the Vatican. Mitchell Sharp, then the Secretary of State for External Affairs, felt that naming Robbins (a self-described humanist and admirer of the Unitarian church) would do well to blunt criticism from Protestant Canadians, many of whom opposed establishing diplomatic relations with the Holy See, at all. Robbins presented his credential in Rome to Pope Paul VI on 23 April 1970 and Robbins reported that he felt warmly received there. His term as ambassador lasted for three years ending in 1973. His son, Emmett, interrupted his career teaching classics at the University of Toronto to act as his father's secretary at the embassy in Rome. John Robbins retired to Regina, Saskatchewan where he died 7 March 1995.

== Awards ==
Robbins has been awarded honorary doctorate degrees from University of New Brunswick and University of British Columbia in 1959, Laval University in 1967, his alma mater University of Manitoba in 1967, and the school he helped found, Carleton University, in 1969.
