= Kevin Kavanagh =

Canadian businessman

Kevin Patrick Kavanagh
- Born: September 27, 1932 (age 92); Brandon, Manitoba, Canada
- Known for: CEO of The Great-West Life Assurance Company
- Awards: Order of Canada; Order of Manitoba

Kevin Patrick Kavanagh, CM OM (born September 27, 1932) is a Canadian businessman.

Born in Brandon, Manitoba, Kavanagh received a Bachelor of Commerce degree from the University of Manitoba in 1953. After graduating he started working for The Great-West Life Assurance Company in 1953. He worked his way up the ranks becoming president and CEO of Great-West Life from 1979 to 1990. From 1986 to 1992, he was president and CEO of Great-West Lifeco. He was Chancellor of Brandon University from 1996 to 2002.

In 2002, he was made a Member of the Order of Canada. In 2009, he was made a Member of the Order of Manitoba.

Academic offices
Preceded by Ronald D. Bell	Chancellor of Brandon University; 1996–2002	Succeeded by Edward Schreyer
