= Roy Prosterman =

American legal scholar (1935–2025)

- Born: July 13, 1935; Chicago, Illinois, U.S.
- Died: February 27, 2025 (aged 89); Seattle, Washington, U.S.
- Education: University of Chicago; Harvard University
- Occupations: Founder and Chairman Emeritus of Landesa Rural Development Institute
- Website: Landesa

Roy L. Prosterman (July 13, 1935 – February 27, 2025) was an American legal scholar who was Professor Emeritus of Law at the University of Washington and the founder of the Rural Development Institute (RDI), which changed its name to Landesa in January 2011. He was also active in the fields of land reform, rural development, and foreign aid. He provided advice and conducted research in more than 40 countries in Asia, the former Soviet Union, Europe, the Middle East, and Latin America. Prosterman received many awards and distinctions, including the 2003 Gleitsman International Activist Award, a Schwab Foundation Outstanding Global Social Entrepreneur, the inaugural 2006 Henry R. Kravis Prize in Nonprofit Leadership where he was lauded as "Champion for the World's Poor", and the 2012 Skoll Award for Social Entrepreneurship alongside colleague and Landesa co-founder Tim Hanstad. He was nominated three times for the Nobel Peace Prize, and was also nominated for the World Food Prize, and Alcan Prize for Sustainability. Prosterman was a frequent guest speaker and presenter at world forums on poverty alleviation and was a frequent published author in nonfiction and fiction.

The organization he founded, Landesa, has received numerous awards and distinctions, including the 2015 Conrad N. Hilton Humanitarian Prize and the 2017 LUI Che Woo Prize.

== Background ==
Prosterman was born in Chicago on July 13, 1935. He received a bachelor's degree from the University of Chicago in 1954, and his law degree from Harvard Law School.

Prosterman died in Seattle on February 27, 2025, at the age of 89.

== Founding of Landesa Rural Development Institute ==
In the 1960s, Prosterman was working as an associate attorney on Wall Street at Sullivan & Cromwell (where he stayed for six years before taking a job to teach in 1965), but was troubled by the escalating Vietnam War as thousands of impoverished rural farmers desperate to feed their families joined the Viet Cong.

Prosterman realized that giving poor farmers land rights to the land they were farming would transform the lives of these families, the country, and ultimately the world. It was just an idea. Before he knew it, Prosterman was standing in a rice paddy in the midst of the Vietnam War testing his idea through legislation—the Land to the Tiller program. That legislation gave land rights to one million tenant farmers, allowed them to feed their families, cut Viet Cong recruitment by 80%, and increased rice production in the country by 30%.

== Awards ==
- 2010 University of Chicago Public Service Award
- 2003 Gleitsman Foundation International Activist Award
- 2002 Recognized as top Social entrepreneur by Schwab Foundation for Social Entrepreneurship
