= Rural Development Institute =

Coordinates: 49.8455°N 99.9629°W

- Established: 1989
- Director: Wayne Kelly
- Location: Brandon, Manitoba, Canada
- Affiliations: Brandon University
- Website: brandonu.ca/rdi

The Rural Development Institute (RDI) is an academic research center that was established in 1989 by Brandon University. It focuses on issues affecting rural communities in western Canada and elsewhere. The Institute provides an interface between academic research efforts and the community by acting as a conduit of rural research information and by facilitating community involvement in rural development. RDI has diverse research affiliations, and multiple community and government linkages related to its rural development mandate.

RDI is located in Brandon, Manitoba, Canada.

== History ==
The Rural Development Institute was created in 1989. In 1999, WESTARC (a wholly owned subsidiary of Brandon University) was integrated with RDI. WESTARC has served for almost two decades as a nonprofit consulting group that has concerned itself with the applied research, training and economic development needs of communities and organizations in western Canada. WESTARC has provided project management, research, training and consultancy services to meet the needs of communities, businesses and organizations.

== Advisory Committee ==
The role of the RDI Advisory Committee is to provide general advice and direction to the Institute on matters of rural concern. On a semi-annual basis the Committee meets to share information about issues of mutual interest in rural Manitoba and foster linkages with the constituencies they represent. Members of the Advisory Committee include: Dr. Scott Grills (Chair, Brandon University), Mona Cornock (Manitoba Agriculture, Food and Rural Initiatives), Larry Flynn (Public Health Agency of Canada), Monika Franz-Lien (Manitoba Agriculture, Food and Rural Initiatives), Reg Helwer (Shur-Gro Farm Services), Ben Maendel (Baker Hutterite Colony), Jonathon Maendel (Baker Hutterite Colony), Darell Pack (Rural Secretariat), W.J. Pugh (Meyers Norris Penny), Dr. Fran Racher (Brandon University), Dr. Doug Ramsey (Brandon University), Frank Thomas (Canadian Imperial Bank of Commerce), Larry Wark (MTS Communications Inc.), Dr. Dion Wiseman (Brandon University), Dr.Robert Annis (Brandon University).

== Research domains ==
RDI responds to rural challenges and opportunities by focusing on a comprehensive range of research topics, including:

- Community economic development (CED)
- Community leadership
- Environmental and agro-economic issues
- Information management and technology utilization
- Policy and program research and development
- Rural adaptation and change
- Rural/northern health & well-being
- Rural Immigration
- Rural tourism

== Research team ==
In June 2009, William Ashton was named the new Director of RDI, replacing Dr. Robert C. Annis. RDI researchers include: Robert Annis, Marian Beattie, Kenneth Beesley, Kenneth Bessant, Jill Bucklaschuk, Susannah Cameron, Wayne Dibgy, John Everitt, Barbara Gfellner, Ryan Gibson, Diane Martz, Alison Moss, Beth Peers, Fran Racher, Doug Ramsey, Karen Rempel, and Ray Silvius.

== Linkages ==
RDI has linkages with major research and research institutions with rural interests, such as:

- Canadian University Network on Rural Development (CUNORD)
- New Rural Economy
- Community Futures Manitoba
- Community Economic Development Technical Assistance Program
- Canadian Community Economic Development Network
- Leafy Spurge Stakeholders Group
