= Sakena Yacoobi =

Afghan activist

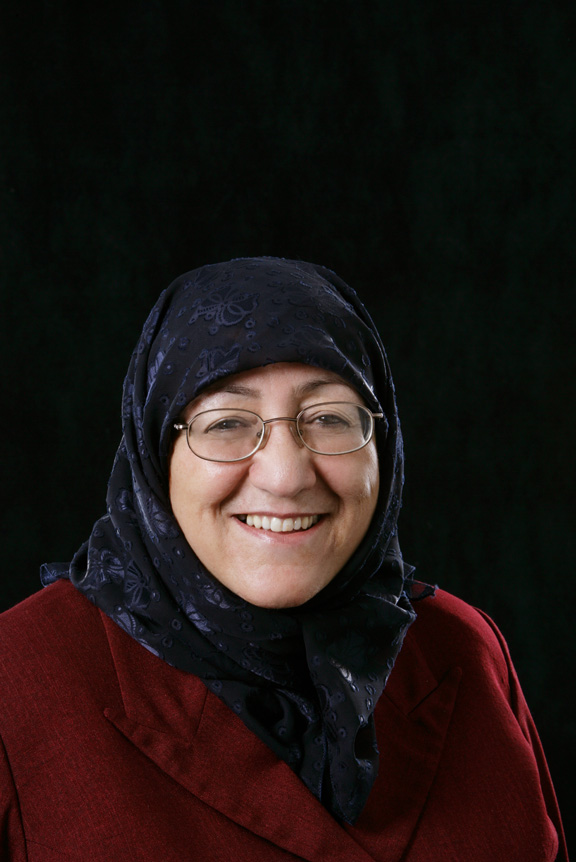
- Yacoobi in 2006
- Born: 1949 or 1950 (age 75–76); Herat, Kingdom of Afghanistan
- Education: University of the Pacific, Loma Linda University

Sakena Yacoobi (Dari: سکینه یعقوبی) is an Afghan activist known for her work for promoting access to education for women and children. She is the founder and executive director of the women-led NGO Afghan Institute of Learning. For her work, Yacoobi has received international recognition, including the 2013 Opus Prize, the 2015 WISE Prize, the 2016 Harold W. McGraw Prize in Education, and an honorary degree from Princeton University.

== Biography ==
Born in Herat, Afghanistan, to a Shia family, Yacoobi moved to the United States in the 1970s, obtaining a bachelor's degree in biological sciences from the University of the Pacific in 1977, going on to gain a master's degree in public health from Loma Linda University. Yacoobi worked as a professor and health consultant in Grosse Pointe, Michigan before returning to Afghanistan in 1990. Following this, she worked with Afghan refugees in Pakistan and published eight Dari-language teacher training guides. During this time, Yacoobi served as an Agency Co-ordinating Body for Afghan Relief delegate, working on the education element of the United Nations' Rehabilitation Plan for Afghanistan.

In addition to her work with the Afghan Institute of Learning, Yacoobi is also the co-founder and vice president of Creating Hope International, a Michigan-based non-profit organisation, in addition to multiple private enterprises in Afghanistan, including schools, a hospital, and a radio station.

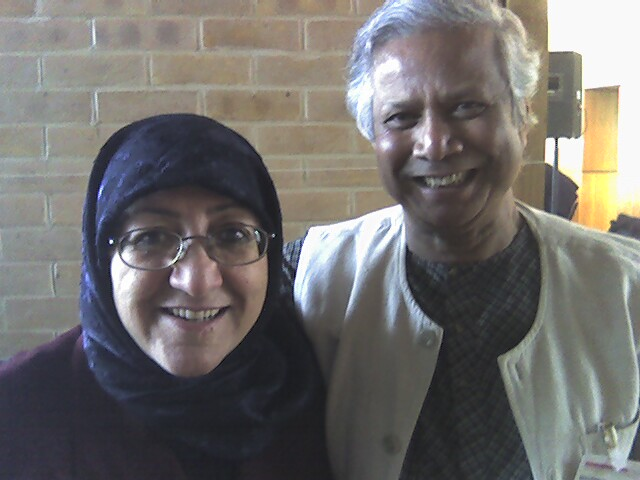
Sakena Yacoobi with Nobel laureate Muhammad Yunus

== Afghan Institute of Learning ==
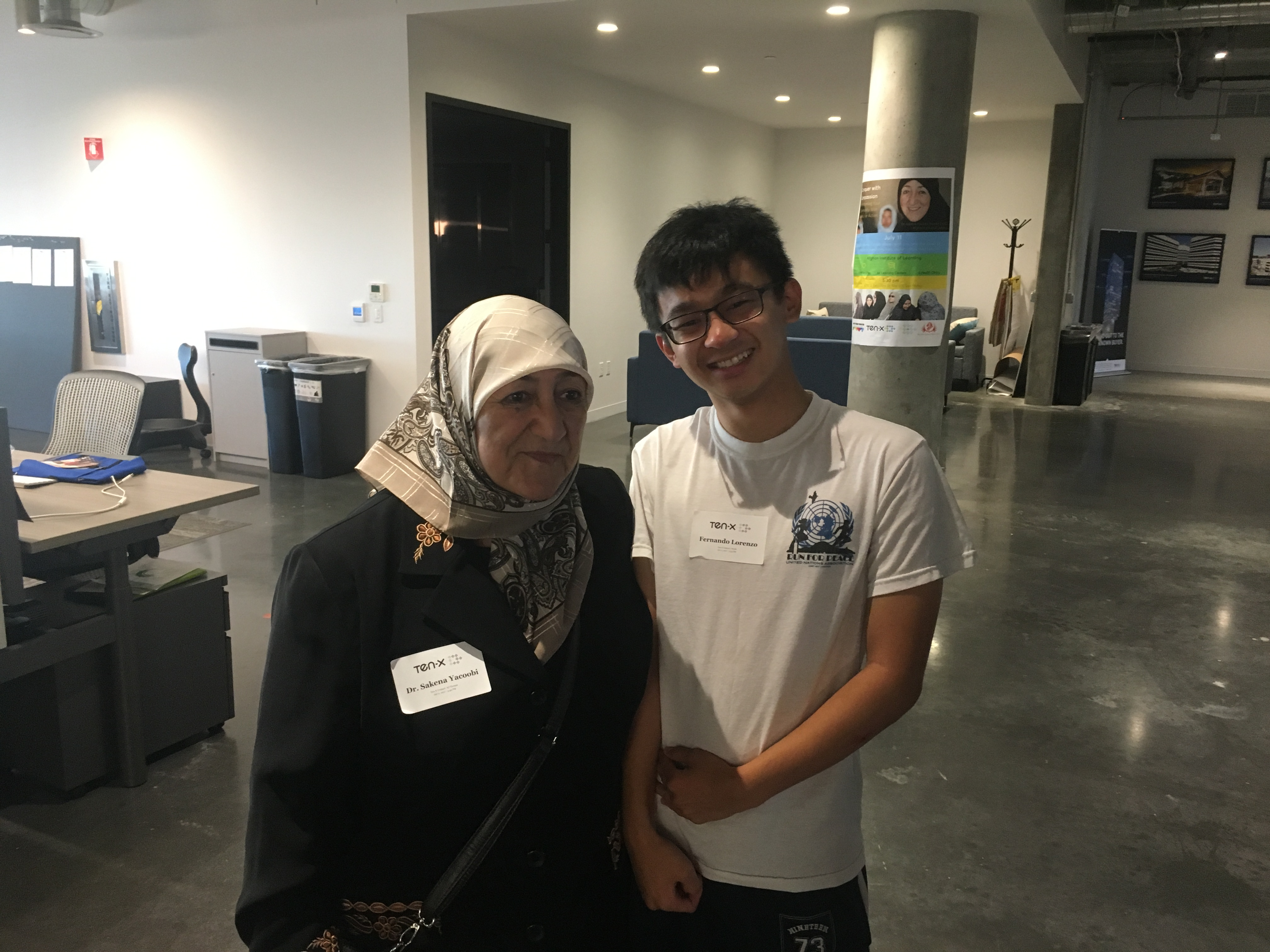
Sakena Yacoobi with Fernando Lorenzo

In 1995, Yacoobi established the Afghan Institute of Learning in order to provide teacher training to Afghan women, in addition to supporting children's access to education and providing health education to families. The organisation's aims are to work from a grassroots level to bring education and health services to disenfranchised Afghan women, including those in rural areas and from poor families in cities.

During the 1990s, following the national closure of girls' schools by the Taliban, the Afghan Institute for Learning supported 80 underground home schools, providing education for 3,000 girls. Following the defeat of the Taliban in 2001, it became the first organisation to open 'Learning Centres' for Afghan women. In 2015, it opened a legal clinic providing free legal advice to Afghan women.

Presently, the Afghan Institute of Learning provides training programmes, Learning Centres, schools, medical clinics, and legal clinics, operating in both Afghanistan and Pakistan.

== Recognition ==
Yacoobi and the Afghan Institute of Learning have received international attention and accolades for their work.

In 2001, Yacoobi was awarded the Bill Graham Award from the Rex Foundation in recognition of the institute's efforts to assist child victims of political oppression and human rights violations. In 2003, they were co-recipients of the 2003 Peacemakers in Action Award from the Tanenbaum Center for Interreligious Understanding, and subsequently received the 2004 Women's Rights Prize from the Gruber Foundation. In 2005, she was awarded the Democracy Award from the National Endowment for Democracy, and was nominated for the Nobel Peace Prize. In 2006, Yacoobi received the Citizen Leader Award from the University of the Pacific, in addition to the Skoll Award for Social Entrepreneurship. In 2007, she became the first Ashoka Fellow to be from Afghanistan. She received an honorary doctorate from the University of the Pacific and the Gleitsman International Activist Award from Harvard University. In 2008, she received an honorary doctorate from Loma Linda University, and in 2009 was awarded the Americans for UNFPA Board of Advocates Award for the Healthy and Dignity of Women. She was granted the Henry R. Kravis Prize in Nonprofit Leadership in 2009, and the following year received the Jonathan Mann Award for Global Health and Human Rights alongside the Asia Social Entrepreneur of the Year Award from the Schwab Foundation. In 2012, she was awarded the World's Children's Prize, and the following year received the $1 million Opus Prize.

Nationally, Yacoobi has received service awards from the Ministry of Education in Herat, in addition to the district governments of Mir Bacha Kot, Shakardara, Kalakan, and Kabul.

Yacoobi has also become a prominent speaker on the education of women and children in Afghanistan, including giving talks for the Clinton Foundation, the California Governor's Conference on Women, the World Economic Forum, the D. D. Kosambi Festival of Ideas, the World Justice Forum, the TEDWomen Conference.

She was recognized as one of the BBC's 100 women of 2017.

== Works ==
- Sakena Yacoobi, Women Educating Women in the Afghan Diaspora: Why and How, in Religious Fundamentalisms and the Human Rights of Women (ed. Courtney W. Howland), Palgrave MacMillan (2001), ISBN 0-312-29306-2
