= INJAZ Al-Arab =

Non-profit organization

- Founded: 2004; 22 years ago
- Location: Amman, Jordan
- Region served: MENA
- Website: www.injazalarab.org

INJAZ Al-Arab (Arabic: إنجاز العرب) is a non-profit organization for education and training in workforce readiness, financial literacy and entrepreneurship across the Arab World. INJAZ Al-Arab is the Regional Operating Center of JA Worldwide (JAW), one of the largest global non-governmental organizations dedicated to addressing fundamental social and economic challenges faced by young people. INJAZ Al-Arab is also an active participant in the United Nations Global Compact. Over 7 million students have participated in a broad base of entrepreneurship training opportunities aimed at developing basic business skills to start and run their own businesses while obtaining soft skills increasingly demanded by the private sector. Since its inception, INJAZ Al-Arab has built a network of over 100,000 classroom volunteers, who are leaders from the corporate world. INJAZ Al-Arab has a Regional Board of Directors, which comprises 15 executives, as well as a team of staff, led by Akef Aqrabawi, President and CEO of the Middle East/North Africa for JA Worldwide.

== History ==
INJAZ Al-Arab's Region Map

INJAZ Al-Arab began its work in the Middle East & North Africa (MENA) region in 2004, as it joinedJunior Achievement, and established its regional office. Since joining JA and under INJAZ Al-Arab's founder and former CEO Soraya Salti and Akef Aqrabawi's leadership, INJAZ has grown in program availability, student participation, and reach. Today, it operates in 13 countries as a federation of national operations. INJAZ Al-Arab's network includes Algeria, Bahrain, Egypt, Kuwait, Lebanon, Morocco, Oman, Palestine, Qatar, Saudi Arabia, Tunisia, United Arab Emirates, and Yemen.

== INJAZ Al-ARAB Social Media ==
INJAZ Al-Arab as a network has 1,249,483 followers regionally on all active social media channels.

- facebook; 834,405
- instagram; 198,234
- LinkedIn; 100,204
- X; 97,964
- YouTube: 12,011
- TikTok; 6,665

== Activities ==
INJAZ Al-Arab's programs focus on four core areas of business education which are:

- Work Readiness: The widespread mismatch between the skills attained in school and those demanded by the private sector are feeding current youth unemployment rates. INJAZ Al-Arab programs build teamwork, critical thinking, problem-solving, communication, and leadership skills employers look for.
- Financial Literacy: Teaching young people about responsible money management is key to building their own financial security and an economically prosperous future for themselves.
- Entrepreneurship: Entrepreneurship education prepares youth to be responsible, enterprising individuals. Immersing them in real-life learning experiences allows them to take measured risks, manage the results, and learn from the outcomes. This growing number of youth-led enterprises creates new jobs and fuels economic development.
- STEM & Technology: programs that aim to equip young individuals with the knowledge and skills needed to succeed in a technology-driven world.

== 2022/2023 Impact Report Numbers ==
- 1,000,022 Learning Experiences
- 500,471 INSPIRE Learning Experiences
- 451,395 PREPARE Learning Experiences
- 48,156 SUCCEED Learning Experiences
- 22,859 Volunteers delivering INJAZ programs
- 4,403,645 Volunteering hours
- 12 % Corporate volunteers out of the total number of volunteers recruited to deliver INJAZ programs
- 1,809 Partner schools
- 622 Partner universities

== Sponsors ==
Alghanim Industries, Boeing, BNY Mellon, Citi Foundation, Deloitte, ExxonMobil, FedEx, Google, Hill+Knowlton Strategies, HSBC, Investcorp, MasterCard, McKinsey & Company, MetLife, Microsoft, MBC Group, Ooredoo, PepsiCo, SAP, The Starbucks Foundation, Zain Group, PMIEF Educational Foundation, Consolidated Contractors Company, Tiktok, and Nestle.

== Knowledge Partners ==
Bett MEA, Harvard Business Review, MIT Enterprise Forum, World Economic Forum, Oliver Wyman.

== Awards & Publications ==
INJAZ Al-Arab and Soraya Salti, former CEO, were awarded The Henry R. Kravis Prize in Nonprofit Leadership in 2012.

INJAZ Al-Arab, along with six other organizations throughout the world, was awarded the Skoll Foundation for Social Entrepreneurship in 2009.

Named one of the top 200 NGOs in the world by NGO Advisor for eight consecutive years, for the social, economic, and humanitarian impact they deliver.

INJAZ Al-Arab was selected as a laureate for the TAKREEM Foundation’s Excellence in Education’ award for the year 2020

INJAZ Al-Arab won the GOLD at the 2016 Middle East Public Relations Association (MEPRA) for best Corporate Social Responsibility.

INJAZ was recognized as part of the Harvard Global Education Initiative under the Harvard Graduate School of Education. The initiative recognized INJAZ for putting 21st-century education into practice.

A 2012 study supported by Citi Foundation by professors from Harvard and Dubai School of Government (now named Mohammed Bin Rashid School of Government) found that INJAZ Al-Arab alumni have a significantly shorter waiting period than other youth while searching for jobs after graduation.

INJAZ has been recognized as part of the Harvard Global Education Initiative under the Harvard Graduate School of Education. The initiative recognizes INJAZ Al-Arab for putting 21 st century education into practice.

Professor Fernando M. Reimers of Harvard University published his book on INJAZ Al-Arab "Learning How to Improve the World: How INJAZ Al-Arab Helps Youth in the Middle East Develop an Entrepreneurial Mindset". The book is a study done by Reimers showing the impact of the Company Program on 800 students in six different MENA countries that are Member Nations of INJAZ Al-Arab.

The resilience and success of INJAZ Al-Arab’s network throughout the COVID-19 pandemic in 2020 was featured in Harvard Professor Fernando Reimers new published book "Leading Educational Change During a Pandemic- Reflections on Hope and Possibility". The book discusses how (28) entrepreneurial educators pivoted to sustain educational opportunities. Book contribution by Akef Aqrabawi.

== INJAZ Al-Arab in the News ==
Queen Rania of Jordan is a supporter of INJAZ Al-Arab. In 2015, she chaired a discussion with entrepreneurs in celebration of INJAZ Al-Arab's 10th anniversary, showcasing alumni's success stories.

INJAZ Al-Arab is frequent in the Skoll Foundation website, whose mission is to drive large-scale change by investing in, connecting, and celebrating social entrepreneurs and the innovators who help them solve the world’s most pressing problems.

INJAZ Al-Arab has been mentioned several times in The Skoll World Forum Online, a year-round platform that focuses on a variety of areas, including education and economic opportunity. The Skoll World Forum Online is affiliated with the Skoll Foundation. Akef Aqrabawi, President and CEO of Middle East/North Africa for Junior Achievement Worldwide. INJAZ Al-Arab has also been featured on the website.

Soraya Salti, who has also been awarded the Skoll Foundation Award in 2009, has been listed as a social entrepreneur with the Schwab Foundation for Social Entrepreneurship. According to Schwab, social entrepreneurs drive social innovation and transformation in various fields including education, health, environment and enterprise development.
