= Marjorie Beaucage =

Canadian filmmaker

- Born: 1947 (age 78–79); Vassar, Manitoba, Canada
- Education: University of Brandon; Ryerson University
- Known for: documentary filmmaking

Marjorie Beaucage (born 1947) is a Canadian filmmaker and teacher from Manitoba.

== Early life and education ==
Beaucage was born in Vassar, Manitoba in 1947. She obtained a degree in education from the University of Brandon and studied film at Ryerson University.

== Career ==
Beaucage was a Catholic nun of the order of Our Lady of Missions in Manitoba. She spent 25 years in adult education and community organizing before turning to film in her 40s. Her documentary films are often collaborative in nature and have reflected the participation of Indigenous peoples in political forums, conferences, local activism, and community events. Her 1997 film Ntapueu... i am telling the truth followed the environmental impact work of the Innu Nation regarding a mining project in Labrador's Voisey's Bay. She was invited by the Innu to capture their work following her documentation of the efforts of elders in northern Saskatchewan during a 1992 Wiggins Bay blockage in opposition to the province's clearcutting policies

In 2017 Beaucage released Coming In Stories: Two Spirit in Saskatchewan in an attempt to raise awareness about the experiences of two-spirit individuals in Saskatchewan. The coordinator of OUTSaskatoon, Beaucage explained in an interview with the Saskatoon StarPhoenix that she made the film because of the number of people who don't understand the role and experiences of two spirit individuals: "there are really young people that have lived experiences and need support, so the film was created to be intimate face-to-face storytelling that opens people's hearts and helps them to understand in a way they didn't before."

Beaucage is the co-founder of the Aboriginal Film and Video Art Alliance.

== Films ==
- Bingo (1991)
- Good Grief (1993)
- China... Through One Woman's Eyes (1996)
- Ntapueu... i am telling the truth (1997)
- Proz Anthology (2000)
- Coming In Stories: Two Spirit in Saskatchewan (2017)

== Awards ==
Year	Award
2018	Saskatchewan Arts Awards: artistic excellence award
2024	Governor General's Award in Visual and Media Arts.
