= Landesa =

American nonprofit organization

- Founded: 1981
- Founder: Roy Prosterman
- Type: Non-operating private foundation (IRS exemption status): 501(c)(3)
- Purpose: Land rights, Women's rights, Ending poverty
- Location: Seattle, Washington
- Key people: Chris Jochnick, President and CEO; Roy Prosterman, Founder and chairman Emeritus; Tim Hanstad, Co-Founder and Senior Advisor
- Website: www.landesa.org

Landesa Rural Development Institute is a nonprofit organization that works with governments and local organizations to obtain legal land rights for poor families. Since 1967, Landesa has helped more than 700 million poor families in 66 countries gain legal control over their land.

Landesa partners with governments, world leaders, NGOs, foundations, donor agencies such as the World Bank, USAID, Bill & Melinda Gates Foundation, the United Nations Food and Agriculture Organization, and others to design and implement land laws, policies and programs that provide opportunity, further economic growth, and promote social justice through land rights.

Headquartered in Seattle, Landesa has program offices in Beijing, China; Bhubaneswar, Delhi, Kolkata, Lucknow, and Patna, India; Yangon, Myanmar; and Dar es Salaam, Tanzania. Landesa currently works in China, Ethiopia, Ghana, India, Kenya, Liberia, Malawi, Mozambique, Myanmar, Rwanda, and Tanzania.

== History ==
Landesa was founded as the Rural Development Institute in 1981 by Roy Prosterman, a Harvard Law School graduate who left his Wall Street career at Sullivan & Cromwell to teach at the University of Washington School of Law where he established the Law in Sustainable Development Program. Troubled by the Vietnam War, Prosterman recognized that secure land rights could provide the rural poor a place to grow food to feed their family and a foundation to raise themselves out of poverty without being forced to join the Viet Cong. His "land to the tiller" program led to a 30% increase in rice production, and an 80% decrease in Viet Cong recruitment.

Roy Prosterman works with Vietnamese farmers

== Activities ==
Since its founding, Landesa has had the goal of securing land rights for the world's poorest people. This is because more than two billion people lives in extreme poverty, surviving on $2 a day or less. Of those, more than 75 percent live in rural areas and rely on agriculture for their sustenance. Most do not have secure rights to land and therefore, limited opportunity to build a better future for themselves and their family. True ownership of land in the developing world determines access to shelter, income, education, healthcare, and improves economic and nutritional security.

Landesa attorneys and land tenure specialists craft a variety of land and law-related institutional reforms to help developing countries bring land rights to their poorest. Upon the invitation of the host government, Landesa's staff conducts field assessments, institutional assessments, legislative drafting and policy advice. Landesa then assist with implementing the new land laws, and can help organize pilot programs. Landesa has been involved with land administration consulting, social impact studies, implementation planning, implementation monitoring, training, public education programs, and program design and management. There are typically five primary elements to this work.

1. Research in the field to identify existing conditions where new land law/regulations/policies could benefit the locals
2. Design and develop laws and regulations that create and sustain improved land system programs
3. Advocate the implications and details of the plan to public officials, future recipients, and other stakeholders
4. Implement plan and assist in monitoring the changes; evaluate the new land system in place and make further modifications and improvements where appropriate

One plan will not work for every country, so most of Landesa's time goes into tailoring its work for each specific location. For instance, Landesa's "micro-land ownership" program in India provides landless families with a micro-plot as small as 1/10 of an acre on which they can build shelter, grow food to supplement the family diet and income, and raise livestock or start a micro-enterprise. Like the idea that started the "microcredit" movement, "micro-land ownership" has the potential to provide opportunity for millions of the world's poorest.

Map of all countries in which Landesa has worked

== Consulting services ==
Landesa's fee-for-service practice focuses on the legal, policy, institutional, and educational issues of land tenure, land access, land market development, land conflicts, land acquisition and resettlement, and land registration systems.

Landesa employs a staff of more than 120 worldwide, including over 20 senior land tenure specialists with legal, economic, gender, and agricultural expertise, complemented by a professional staff with livelihood, natural resource management, economics, sociology, and other social science expertise. Landesa also employs a team of research assistants who provide legal research and writing support.

Landesa's work focuses primarily on rural and peri-urban contexts in developing and transitional economies. Services include field assessments, institutional assessments, legislative drafting and policy advice, development of follow-on regulations, and procedures, technical support for legal assistance, social impact studies, implementation planning, implementation monitoring, training, public education programs, and program design and management.

== Global Center for Women's Land Rights ==
Providing secure land rights to women is essential to addressing poverty and hunger around the world. Today, Landesa works in China, India and post-conflict areas of Africa with a focus on women's land rights. Women comprise over 50% of the world's population, are responsible for 60–80% of the world's food production, yet, in many countries, they cannot inherit or own land. The Landesa Center for Women's Land Rights works to help women and girls transform their communities. There is great potential for change: with secure rights to land, women and girls can improve food security, education, health, and economic development for themselves and their families. When women have secure rights to land, they can become investors in their family's future and ensure that their children's needs are met.

Studies have found that when women have secure rights to land:

- Family nutrition and health improve
- Women are less likely to contract and spread HIV/AIDS and are better able to cope with the effects of AIDS
- Women are less likely to be victims of domestic violence
- Children are more likely to get an education and stay in school longer
- Women may have better access to microcredit

In short, investing in women's land rights creates an ripple effect that spreads to her family, village, and beyond. However, in much of the world, while women shoulder the burden of food production, they often don't have secure rights to the land they farm. Although they till the fields, they are often barred from inheriting or owning those fields, a prerogative usually left for their husbands and fathers.

To address these challenges and unite the global community in support of women's land rights, the Landesa Center for Women's Land Rights was launched in 2009. Landesa's Center provides resources and training on women's land rights and connects policymakers, researchers, and practitioners from around the world. Landesa's Center pilots solutions to women's lack of secure land rights. It educates development experts about the gap between customary and institutional law and ensures that this is addressed in Landesa's projects. Landesa's Center ensures that women remain a core focus of Landesa's work to help the world's poorest.

Women smile with their land titles

=== Initiatives ===
==== Global Fellowship Program ====
Landesa's Global Fellowship Program provides training opportunities for qualified professionals seeking to pursue a career in helping to secure land and property rights for women and girls. The program is designed to provide a career path and specialized training opportunities for legal professionals in the U.S., experienced professionals in developing countries who could benefit from comparative experience, and experienced non-legal professionals from NGOs who seek comparative legal knowledge.

==== e-Library on Women's Property Rights ====
Landesa's Global Center for Women's Land Rights is building a database of formal laws related to women's land rights from every country in the world. This "e-library" will also include research on customary law related to women's land rights where available. The e-Library on women's property rights will be an open-source platform, allowing users to share and post laws and related materials on how those laws are practiced thorough a discussion forum. The e-Library will be cross-referenced via topics (widows' rights, dowry, girls' inheritance, etc.) as well as by countries and regions in a variety of languages. This helps legal practitioners and women's advocates create more effective and suitable programming.

==== Girls and Land ====
Daughters do not traditionally inherit land, because they typically move away from the village to their husband's home after marriage. Most girls leave their family homes with no economic asset of their own (such as land), leaving them vulnerable and powerless in their new homes. To address this, Landesa is working in partnership with its partners to help girls gain a critical economic asset—land—to reduce their vulnerability to poverty, gender-based violence, HIV, early marriage, and trafficking, and to gain opportunities for a better future.

== Awards and honors ==
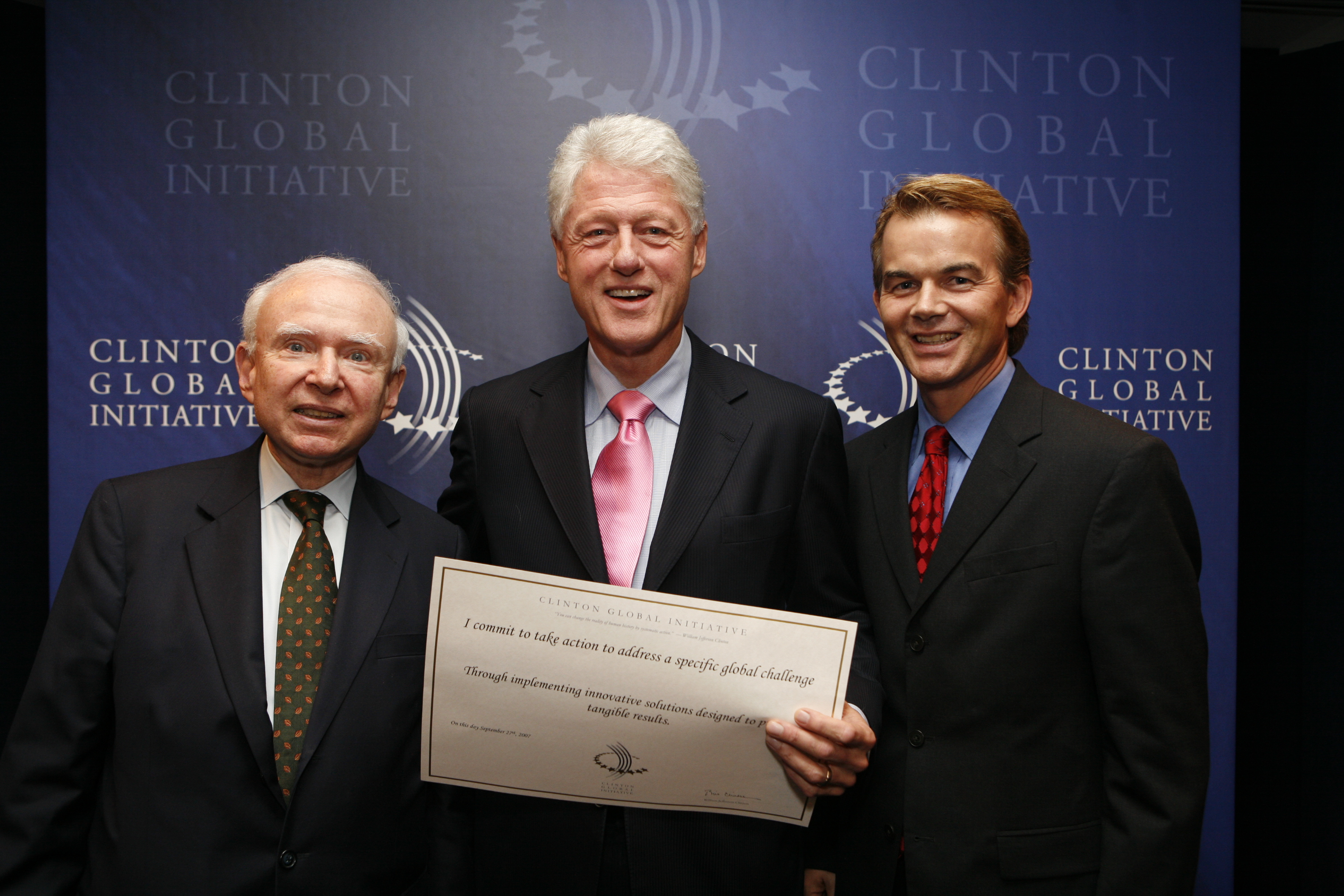
Prosterman, Clinton, and Hanstad pose during the 2007 CGI

- (2017) LUI Che Woo Prize, Welfare Betterment Prize, LUI Che Woo Prize
- (2015) Conrad N. Hilton Humanitarian Prize, Conrad N. Hilton Foundation
- (2013) Top Human Rights NGO, The Global Journal
- (2013) Top 16 Best NGOs, The Global Journal
- (2012) Skoll Award for Social Entrepreneurship, Skoll Foundation
- (2011) Top 100 Best NGOs, The Global Journal
- (2011) Global Hero Award (Awarded to Roy Prosterman), Global Washington
- (2002–2010) Outstanding Global Social Entrepreneur, Schwab Foundation for Social Entrepreneurship
- (2009) Evergreen Award, Executive Alliance
- (2009) Telly Award (for film "Land is Hope), People's Telly Awards
- (2008) Development Marketplace Award, World Bank
- (2008) Razoo Top 100 Nonprofits, Razoo
- (2008) Finalist, United Nations Public Service Award, United Nations
- (2008) World Citizen of the Year, World Affairs Council
- (2007) Featured Commitment (Micro-land Ownership in India), Clinton Global Initiative, Clinton Foundation
- (2007) Featured Commitment (Center for Women and Land), Clinton Global Initiative, Clinton Foundation
- (2007) Finalist, Hilton Humanitarian Award, Conrad N. Hilton Foundation
- (2007) Finalist, Alcan Prize for Sustainability, International Business Leaders Forum
- (2006) Henry R. Kravis Prize in Leadership, Henry R. Kravis Institute in Leadership, Claremont McKenna College
- (2003) Gleitsman International Award, Gleitsman Foundation
- (2002) Outstanding Global Social Entrepreneur, Schwab Foundation for Social Entrepreneurship
- (1996) Courageous Award, Washington State Bar Association
- (1991) John and Marguerite Walker Corbally Professor in Public Service
- (1993) International Citizen of the Year, Seattle International District Rotary
- (1990) Outstanding Public Service Award, University of Washington
- (1973) Ralph Bunche Award for Outstanding Contribution to World Peace through Law, Seattle-King County Bar Association.
