= Canadian Rural Revitalization Foundation =

Canadian charity

- Fondation Canadienne pour la Revitalisation Rurale (FCRR)
- Formation: 1989; 37 years ago
- Type: Nonprofit
- Location: Canada
- Website: www.crrf.ca

The Canadian Rural Revitalization Foundation (French: Fondation Canadienne pour la Revitalisation Rurale) (CRRF) is a private organization in Canada that works to revitalize and increase the sustainability of rural Canada.

CRRF is a national nonprofit society chartered in the Province of Alberta and is a federally registered charity.

Founded in 1989, CRRF was originally known as the Agricultural and Rural Restructuring Group.

== Description ==
CRRF members include rural leaders, rural organizations, development practitioners, government policy makers, researchers, students, and other stakeholders. The organization researches issues such as rural health and social provision, local and regional economies, local government and community governance, education, organization development, environmental management and stewardship.

CRRF addresses:

- the need for jobs and wealth generating activities.
- the need for institutional flexibility within the private sector, and within social and governing organizations in rural Canada.
- the need for urban and rural people to help each other find ethical environmental and economic solutions to the problems of sustainability and rural dependence.
- the need for continuing learning to enable rural populations to participate actively in the economic life of their country.

== The State of Rural Canada ==
In September 2015, CRRF launched The State of Rural Canada book. The edited book was the first comprehensive review of provincial and territorial rural policies. This initiative was followed-up in September 2017 with The State of Rural Canada Version II: Mapping Rural Innovation.

== Conferences a learning events ==
Each year CRRF co-hosts a national conference, workshops, forums, and symposia about rural issues in Canada.

- 2018: Health and Shared Prosperity (Saskatoon, Saskatchewan)
- 2017: Different by Design (Nelson, British Columbia)
- 2016: Building Vibrant Rural Communities (Guelph, Ontario)
- 2015: Building Community Resilience: Culture, Innovation, and Governance in Place (Summerside, Prince Edward Island)
- 2014: New Relationships, New Realities (Prince George, British Columbia)
- 2013: Rural Canada Ready to Grow (Thunder Bay, Ontario)
- 2012: Creating Rural Connections (Olds, Alberta)
- 2012: Policy and Research in Community Investment - 2nd National Rural Research Workshop (Ottawa, Ontario)
- 2011: Culture, Place, and Identity at the Heart of Regional Development (St John's, Newfoundland)
- 2011: National Rural Research Workshop (Ottawa, Ontario)
- 2010: On the Bright Side Rural Works (Brandon, Manitoba)
- 2009: Rural Recession to Rural Revitalization (Québec City, Québec)
- 2008: Boom Bust Economies Conference (Inuvik, Northwest Territories)
- 2008: National Rural Research Network Northern Dialogue (Whitehorse, Yukon)
- 2007: Connecting Communities: Rural and Urban (Vermillion, Alberta)
- 2006: Future of Rural Canada (Gatineau, Québec and Lanark, Ontario)
- 2005: Big Lessons from Small Places: Governance in Rural North America and the North Atlantic Rim (Twillingate, Newfoundland)
- 2005: National Rural Immigration Think Tank (Brandon, Manitoba)
- 2004: Local Governance of Rural-Urban Interaction Think Tank (Prince George, British Columbia)
- 2003: Building Rural Capacity in the New Economy (Ste-Damase, Québec)
- 2001: The New Rural Economy: From Challenge to Action (Muenster, Saskatchewan)
