= Canadian Community Economic Development Network =

Community economic development

The Canadian Community Economic Development Network
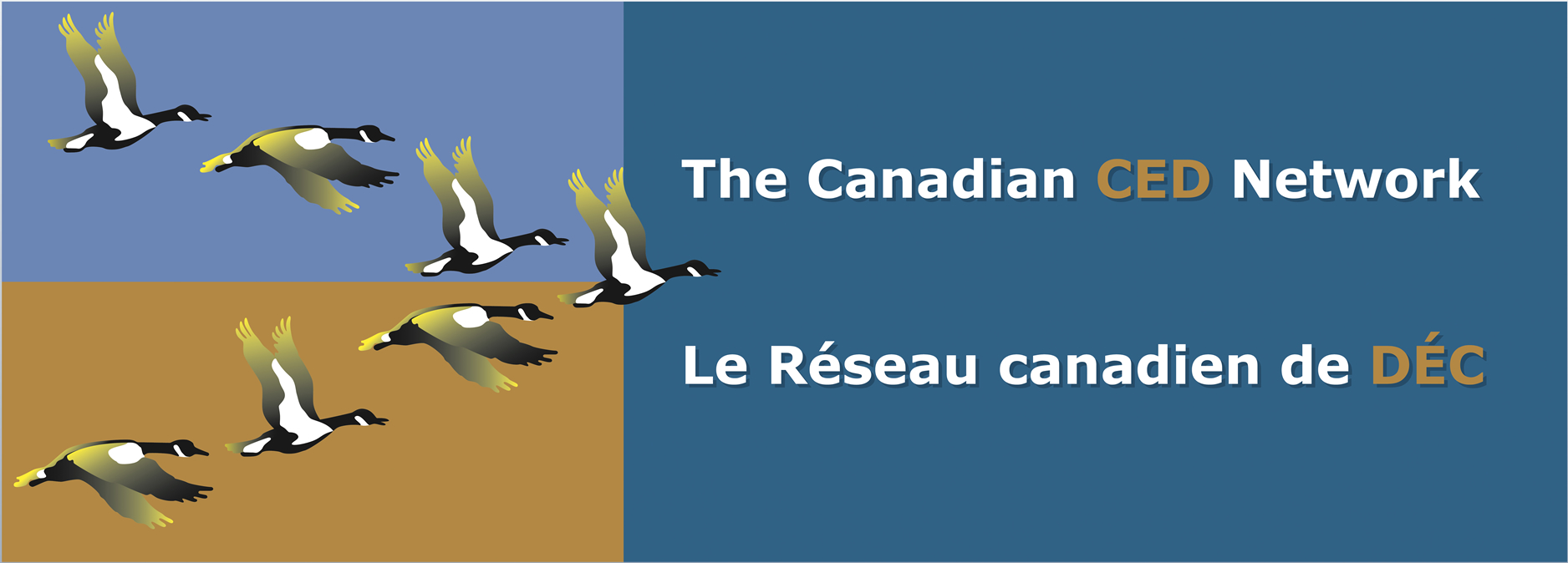
- Abbreviation: CCEDNet
- Purpose: Community economic development
- Locations: Victoriaville, Quebec; Regional Offices: Winnipeg, Manitoba; Toronto, Ontario
- Executive Director: Michael Toye
- Board of directors: Ryan Gibson (President), Diana Jedig (Past President), Carol Madsen (Vice-President), Christine Landry (Treasurer), Yvon Poirier (Secretary), Élodie Bedouet, Norman Greenberg, Marianne Jurzyniec, Wendy Keats, William (Bill) Ninacs, Art Lew, Derek Pachal and Walter Hossli.
- Affiliations: ENP Manitoba, Spark Winnipeg, Ontario Social Economy Roundtable, Social Enterprise Toronto, New Economy Coalition, Intercontinental Network for the Promotion of Social Solidarity Economy, ONESTEP, Job Skills, The Learning Enrichment Foundation, Ontario Nonprofit Network, Pillar Nonprofit Network, Rural Social Enterprise Constellation
- Budget: CAD$ 1.01 million (2014)
- Staff: 15
- Website: https://ccednet-rcdec.ca/en
- French: Le réseau canadien de développement économique communautés (RCDEC)

The Canadian Community Economic Development Network (CCEDNet) (French: Réseau Canadien du Développement Économique Communautaire (RCDEC)) is a member-driven Canadian organization, founded in 1997 to increase the scale and effectiveness of community economic development (CED), helping organizations and individuals strengthen their communities and create solutions to local needs. CCEDNet was created to strengthen community economic development in urban, rural, northern, and Aboriginal communities across Canada in order to contribute to a better social, economic, and environmental conditions at the local level. CCEDNet's members are from community-based organizations, co-operatives, social enterprises, practitioners, active citizens, researchers, and other organizations from every region of Canada. Members are located in all provinces of Canada and two territories and are engaged in a range of activities focused on addressing the inequities born out of the mainstream economy, generally through working with those who have barriers to social and economic inclusion.

CCEDNet is currently a member of international networks such as the New Economy Coalition and the Intercontinental Network for the Promotion of Social Solidarity Economy (RIPESS)

== Community Economic Development Resources ==
CCEDNet operates as an information clearinghouse and has accumulated over 1300 resources directly related to Community Economic Development (CED) - websites, publications, research reports, case studies, videos, and more.

== National Projects ==
Since 2005 CCEDNet has administered a national internship program called CreateAction placing over 200 youth into 6-month placements with CED organizations across Canada. This program has typically been funded by Employment and Social Development Canada. The program has been delivered 9 times, with last placements taking place in 2013/2014.

CCEDNet was the national community partner co-directing the Canadian Social Economy Hub (CSEHub) with the University of Victoria. The CSEHub was a national community-university research alliance funded through the Social Sciences and Humanities Research Council and was part of the Canadian Social Economy Research Partnerships (CSERP). Between 2005 and 2011, the CSEHub acted as a facilitator promoting collaboration among the six regional research centers of CSERP across Canada (Québec, Atlantic, Southern Ontario, Prairies and Northern Ontario, BC and Alberta and the North), and creating opportunities and exchanges with international networks.

=== Conferences ===
CCEDNet organizes a National multi-day learning event focused on Community Economic Development. Future conferences include:

2018: ECONOUS2018 - The National Community Economic Development Conference (Moncton, New Brunswick)

Previous National CCEDNet conferences include:

2017: EconoUs2017 - The National Community Economic Development Conference (Calgary, Alberta)
2016: ECONOUS2016 - The National Community Economic Development Conference (Montréal, Quebec)
2010: National Summit on People-Centred Economy (Ottawa, Ontario)
2009: Full Circle: Sharing a Vision for the 7th Generation (Winnipeg, Manitoba)
2008: Waves of Change: Building People-Centred Economies (Saskatoon, Saskatchewan)
2007: Bring It Home: Building Communities on a Rock Foundation (St. John's, Newfoundland and Labrador)
2006: Leaf, Tree, Forest: Rooting Development in Community (Vancouver, British Columbia)

== Manitoba Projects ==
CCEDNet Manitoba hosts an annual free event called "The Gathering," featuring workshops on a variety of CED and community development topics. In 2015, it hosted its 13th Gathering under the theme "Connecting the Dots", which had over 500 registrants.

CCEDNet Manitoba manages the Enterprising Non-Profits (ENP) program in the province (ENP-MB). ENP-MB is one of seven ENP programs operating throughout Canada to support the social enterprise sector through matching grants, training, and resources.

CCEDNet Manitoba has played an active and key role in the development of provincial policies such as the Manitoba Social Enterprise Strategy.
