= Land law =

Form of law that deals with the rights to use, alienate, or exclude others from land

Land law is the form of law that deals with the rights to use, alienate, or exclude others from land. In many jurisdictions, these kinds of property are referred to as real estate or real property, as distinct from personal property. Land use agreements, including renting, are an important intersection of property and contract law. Encumbrance on the land rights of one, such as an easement, may constitute the land rights of another. Mineral rights and water rights are closely linked, and often interrelated concepts.

Land rights are such a basic form of law that they develop even where there is no state to enforce them; for example, the claim clubs of the American West were institutions that arose organically to enforce the system of rules appurtenant to mining. Squatting, the occupation of land without ownership, is a globally ubiquitous phenomenon. Indigenous land rights is also a perennial related issue.

== National sovereignty ==
Sovereignty, in common law jurisdictions, is often referred to as absolute title, radical title, or allodial title. Nearly all of these jurisdictions have a system of land registration, to record fee simple interests, and a land claim process to resolve disputes.

== Land rights ==
Indigenous land rights are recognized by international law, as well as the national legal systems of common law and civil law countries. In common law jurisdictions, the land rights of indigenous peoples are referred to as aboriginal title. In customary law jurisdictions, customary land is the predominant form of land ownership.

Land reform refers to government policies that take and/or redistribute land, such as a land grant.

Land rights refer to the inalienable ability of individuals to freely obtain, use, and possess land at their discretion, as long as their activities on the land do not impede on other individuals' rights. This is not to be confused with access to land, which allows individuals the use of land in an economic sense (i.e. farming). Instead, land rights address the ownership of land which provides security and increases human capabilities. When a person only has access to land, they are in constant threat of expulsion depending on the choices of the land owner, which limits financial stability.

Land rights are an integral part of Land Laws, as they socially enforce groups of individuals' rights to own land in concurrence with the land laws of a nation. Land Law addresses the legal mandates set forth by a country in regards to land ownership, while land rights refer to the social acceptance of land ownership. Landesa takes the stance that although the law may advocate for equal access to land, land rights in certain countries and cultures may hinder a group's right to actually own land. Laws are important, but they must be backed up by cultural tradition and social acceptance. Therefore, laws concerning land ownership and land rights of a country must be in agreement.

Globally, there has been an increased focus on land rights, as they are so pertinent to various aspects of development. According to Wickeri and Kalhan, land ownership can be a critical source of capital, financial security, food, water, shelter, and resources. The UN Global Land Tool organisation has found that rural landlessness is a strong predictor of poverty and hunger, and negatively impacts Empowerment and the realisation of Human rights. In order to home in on this critical problem of inadequate land rights, The Millennium Development Goal 7D strives to improve the lives of 100 million slum dwellers. This includes increased land rights for impoverished people, which will ultimately lead to a higher quality of life.

Although land rights are fundamental in achieving higher standards of living, certain groups of individuals are consistently left out of land ownership provisions. The law may provide access to land, however, cultural barriers and poverty traps limit minority groups' ability to own land. In order to reach equality, these groups must obtain adequate land rights that are both socially and legally recognised.

== Limits of national jurisdiction and sovereignty ==
Limits of national jurisdiction and sovereignty
Outer space (including Earth orbits; the Moon and other celestial bodies, and their orbits)
national airspace		territorial waters airspace	contiguous zone airspace	international airspace		
land territory surface	internal waters surface	territorial waters surface	contiguous zone surface	Exclusive Economic Zone surface	international waters surface	
internal waters		territorial waters	Exclusive Economic Zone		international waters	
land territory underground		Continental Shelf surface			extended continental shelf surface	international seabed surface
land territory underground		Continental Shelf underground			extended continental shelf underground	international seabed underground

full national jurisdiction and sovereignty
restrictions on national jurisdiction and sovereignty
international jurisdiction per common heritage of mankind

== Land rights and women ==
Several scholars argue that women's lack of sufficient land rights negatively affects their immediate families and the larger community, as well. With land ownership, women can develop an income and allocate this income more fairly within the household. Tim Hanstad claims that providing sufficient land rights for women is beneficial because, once women can exercise those rights the following will be promoted:

- Women will be less likely to contract and spread HIV/AIDS as they do not have to resort to prostitution
- Women will be less likely to be victims of Domestic violence
- Their children will be more likely to get an education and stay in school longer
- Women will be better positioned to get access to Microcredit

In many parts of the world, women have access to land in order to farm and cultivate the land; however, there are traditions and cultural norms which bar women from inheriting or purchasing land. This puts women in a place of dependence on their husbands, brothers, or fathers for their livelihood and shelter. Should there be an illness, domestic violence, or death in the family, women would be left landless and unable to either grow crops for food, or rent land for profit. Land ownership for women is a crucial form of security and income, increasing Empowerment and decreasing Poverty.

=== India ===
Kanakalatha Mukund makes the important point that although women in India have the legal right to own land, very few actually do as a result of the patriarchal practices which dominate the nation. Up until recently, Indian women have been left out of laws regarding the distribution of public land and were forced to rely on the small possibility of obtaining private land from their families. Inheritance laws which cater towards men are one of the key issues behind inequality in land rights. According to Bina Agarwal, land ownership defines social status and political power in the household and in the village, shaping relationships and creating family dynamics. Therefore, inheritance of land automatically puts men above women both in the household, and in the community. Without political pull in the village, and with limited bargaining powers within the household, women lack the voice to advocate for their own rights.

Another issue with land rights in India is that they leave women completely dependent on the lives of their husbands. A study by Bina Agarwal found that in West Bengal, prosperous families turn destitute when the male head of the household dies, as women are not permitted to take over their husband's land. Also, due to cultural tradition, the higher the status of the woman, the less likely she is to have any developed skills that would be useful in finding work. These women are forced to beg for food and shelter once their husbands die because they have not been allowed to gain work experience.

Bina Agarwal argues that land ownership significantly decreases the chance of domestic violence against Indian women. Owning property elevates women to a higher status within the household, allowing more equality and bargaining power. In addition, owning property separately from their husbands allowed women an opportunity of escape from abusive relationships. Agarwal concluded that the prospect of a safe shelter outside of the main household decreases the longevity of domestic violence.

Land rights are critical for women in India due to the heavily patriarchal society in which they live. Cultural perspectives play a key role in the acceptance of equality within land ownership. Women owning land ultimately benefits the household and society as a whole.

The most recent advance towards equality in land rights in India was the Hindu Succession Act of 2005. This act aimed to remove the gender discrimination which was present in the Hindu Succession Act, 1956. In the new amendment, daughters and sons have equal rights to obtain land from their parents. This act was both a legally and socially important move for women's rights to land. Not only did it legally mandate equality in land succession, it also validated women's roles as equals in society.

=== Uganda ===
Uganda's 1995 Constitution enforces equality between men and women, including the acquisition and ownership of land. However, research from Women's Land Link Africa reveals that women remain excluded from land ownership due to customs and deeply ingrained cultural habits. Even when women save up enough money to purchase land, the land is signed in their husband's name, while women sign as the witness. Inheritance practices are a particular obstacle which reduces women empowerment, as well. Land is passed down through male lineage which reinforces women's exclusion from land ownership. Another detriment to equality, pointed out by Women's Land Link Africa, is that women lack sufficient knowledge about the rights they have under the law to own land. Rural, illiterate women do not even have access to the new constitution which guarantees them land rights.

Although the 1995 Constitution provides for equality between men and women, there are still gaps in the law which affect women's rights to land. The law protects the rights to land of wives in marriage; however, it does not address the needs of widows or divorcees. Consequentially, these women are left landless and without the protection land offers. Also, women have a difficult time taking cases to court due to corruption and expensive trials. The trials concerning land take so long to process that many women do not even attempt to seek legal assistance.

Women's Land Link Africa provides suggestions to alleviate inequality in land ownership. Rural women can be educated about their rights through radio campaigns, community discussions, educational outreach programs, and public forums. The cultural nuances must be addressed in policies and community leaders can be educated about inclusion of minority groups. Also, the law itself can address the rights of widows and divorcees in addition to the rights of married women.

== See also ==
- English land law
- Land grabbing
- Split estate
- The Land is Ours
- International Land Coalition
- Struggle for the Land
