= Louis Visentin =

Louis Peter Visentin is a Canadian scientist and former President and Vice-Chancellor of Brandon University. Visentin held this position from May 2000 until his retirement in 2009.

Visentin received his doctorate in molecular biology from the University of Michigan in 1969. Prior to assuming the role of President at Brandon University, he served as Vice President (Academic) with the University of New Brunswick. He is a former member of the National Research Council Governing Council and the Premier of Manitoba's Economic Advisory Council Image Strategy Development Task Group. Visentin was awarded the Queen's Golden Jubilee Medal for service to Canada in 2002 and the Venerable Order of Saint John in 2003.

== See also ==
- List of Canadian university leaders

Academic offices
Preceded by Denis Anderson	President of Brandon University; 2000–2009	Succeeded by Deborah C. Poff
