= Ronald D. Bell =

Canadian petroleum tax judge (1932–2020)

The Honourable Ronald Dean Bell

Judge of the Tax Court of Canada
- In office 1991–2006

Personal details
- Born: 12 February 1932
- Died: 13 January 2020 (aged 87)
- Education: Brandon University; University of Manitoba

Ronald Dean Bell LL. D. (February 2, 1932 – January 13, 2020) was a Canadian lawyer, specializing in petroleum tax issues. He wrote extensively for professional journals, and lectured throughout North America and Europe on tax issues. He was also a generous donor and patron to Brandon University and the Canada Council.

== Career ==
Bell was born in Deloraine, Manitoba. He graduated from Brandon College with a Bachelor of Arts in 1951 and obtained a law degree from the University of Manitoba in 1955. From 1955 to 1959, he worked as a solicitor for Canada's Department of National Revenue, Taxation Division and later became a partner in Fenerty & Co, a Calgary law firm. In 1978, he was appointed to the Queen’s Privy Council. In 1978, he formed Bell Felesky Flynn, a law practice focusing on taxation.

Bell was the Chancellor of Brandon University from 1990 to 1996 and acted as a patron and donor to the university, serving on many boards, and promoting BU across the country, while also making financial contributions to scholarships and campaigns, and donating many gifts of art. His service to Brandon University was acknowledged with various honours and awards such as inducting him into the Brandon University Hall of Fame (2002) and awarding him an Honorary Doctorate in 2006. Bell was also a donor to the Canada Council.

In 1991, he was appointed Judge of the Tax Court of Canada.
