= Brandon University =

University in Brandon, Canada

Coordinates: 49°50′43″N 99°57′45″W

- Former name: Brandon College
- Motto: Αληθευοντες δε εν αγαπη
- Motto in English: Speaking the truth in love"
- Type: Public
- Established: 1899; 127 years ago
- Academic affiliations: AUCC, IAU, ACU, CUSID, Campus Manitoba, CUP.
- Endowment: C$34 million
- Chancellor: Mary Jane McCallum
- President: Christine Bovis-Cnossen
- Students: 2,980
- Undergraduates: 2,590
- Postgraduates: 390
- Location: Brandon, Manitoba, Canada
- Campus: Urban
- Colours: Blue & gold
- Nickname: Brandon Bobcats
- Sporting affiliations: U Sports
- Mascot: Bailey the Bobcat
- Website: brandonu.ca

Brandon University is a university located in the city of Brandon, Manitoba, Canada, with an enrolment of approximately 3,375 (2020) full-time and part-time undergraduate and graduate students. The current location was founded on July 13, 1899, as Brandon College as a Baptist institution. It was chartered as a university by then President John E. Robbins on June 5, 1967. The enabling legislation is the Brandon University Act. Brandon University is one of several predominantly undergraduate liberal arts and sciences institutions in Canada.

The university is a member of the Association of Universities and Colleges of Canada (AUCC) and the Association of Commonwealth Universities (ACU), the Canadian University Society for Intercollegiate Debate (CUSID) and a member of U Sports. Brandon University has a student-to-faculty ratio of 11 to 1 and sixty per cent of all classes have fewer than 20 students. The university press, The Quill, is a member of CUP.

== History ==
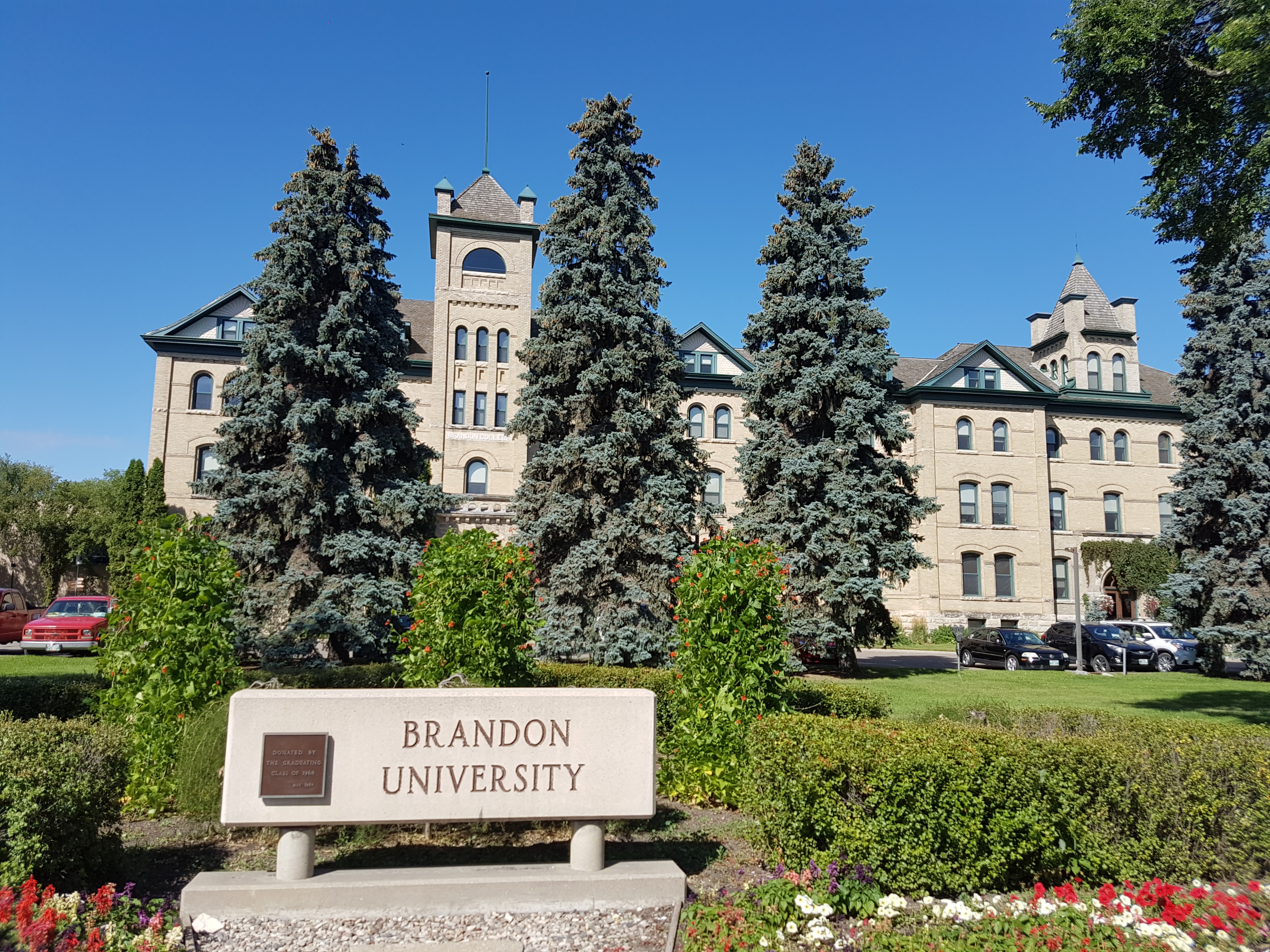
Clark Hall

The university has its origins in the McKee's Academy, founded in 1890 by the Canadian Baptists of Western Canada (member of the Canadian Baptist Ministries).

In 1899, the school was renamed Brandon College. The first principal of the college was A. P. McDiarmid. McKee's Academy, including its building on Rosser Avenue, was merged into the new institution. On July 13, 1900, the cornerstone was laid by Mrs. Davies for the first building of the present campus, at the corner of 18th Street and Lorne Avenue. This and the adjoining Clarke Hall later became Brandon University's administration buildings.

Brandon College, built 1900–01 and the adjoining Clark Hall (1905–06) designed by architect William Alexander Elliott, a 3½-storey brick and stone complex are on the Registry of Historic Places of Canada. At this point Brandon College was a liberal arts college and offered some training in theology, secondary school classes, and a commercial department. A school of music was added in 1906.

The college remained affiliated with McMaster University between 1911 and 1938, and during this time the School of Music granted graduate diplomas in voice and piano.

Class enrolments were reduced during World War I as potential students signed up for military service. More than 200 Brandon College students served in the war; two of these won the Victoria Cross. A platoon from the college joined the Western Universities Battalion in France in 1916.

In 1922 college added a Science Building, and ceased offering commercial courses. Religious studies were integrated into the arts curriculum in 1928. After 1931, the college no longer taught Grade 9, 10, and 11 courses, but Grade 12 Department of Education courses were introduced and continued until 1955.

The Baptist Church ceased financing the institution in 1938 and the college became non-denominational. Funding to keep the college functioning was raised through public subscriptions, by an endowment from A. E. McKenzie, by tax levy from the City of Brandon, and through an annual grant from the government of Manitoba. The college became affiliated with the University of Manitoba; music courses as a credit to BA and BSc degrees were offered, and a Bachelor of Science program was implemented in 1939.

The COTC program was revived at the onset of World War II; once again enrolment dropped, as 234 Brandon College students joined Canada's armed forces. New bursaries and scholarships were introduced. At this point, the college had 14 faculty members and about 100 students. During the late 1940s, the social sciences were introduced.

Brandon College began training high school teachers in 1952, and elementary teachers three years later. The first graduates of the new Bachelor of Training program received degrees in 1971.

As part of a national program to expand universities and colleges, in the 1950s Brandon College increased its enrolment and by 1962 the Arts and Library Building, later named the A. E. McKenzie Building, the J. R. C. Evans Lecture Theatre, the steam plant, Darrach Hall (men's residence), and the dining hall were all completed.

In 1963 the college offered the first B.Mus. program in Manitoba, and the Music Building and Flora Cowan Hall (women's residence) were built. The School of Music developed a conservatory department and offered private tutoring. The Brandon University Gymnasium was opened in 1965.

A Manitoba Historical Plaque was erected in Brandon, Manitoba by the province to commemorate Brandon College's role in Manitoba's heritage.

=== Brandon University ===
In 1967 the college attained university status through the Brandon University Act. Her Royal Highness Princess Alexandra and the Honourable Angus Ogilvy were present at the presentation of the charter on June 5, 1967, That year The Education Building was opened, and in 1969 the Western Manitoba Centennial Auditorium was opened. McMaster Hall, a ten-storey co-ed residence, was completed in 1971, along with the Jeff Umphrey Memorial Centre for Mental Retardation, which housed a bookstore, bank, and a day centre as well as the research centre on mental disability.

The J. R. Brodie Science Centre began holding classes in 1971, and was opened officially in May 1972, providing facilities for a number of departments: chemistry, physics, botany, zoology, geology, geography, mathematics and computer science, and psychology. In early 1980, the Master of Music Degree Program was set up and in September 1980, the Applied Program began. A Master of Music (Education) program was implemented in 1981. A new music building, officially named in 1984 by Her Majesty Queen Elizabeth II as the "Queen Elizabeth II Music Building", was completed in 1985.

In September 1986, Brandon University began offering classes in the Department of Nursing and Health Studies program, providing 2-Year Post-Diploma Baccalaureate Degrees in Nursing and Mental Health. In 1990, the university also offered a major in Business Administration through the Faculty of Arts. A Masters of Education program was set up in 1990, and in 1991 the college offered a minor in Women's Studies in the Faculty of Arts. In 1993, a minor in Aboriginal Art was approved, and in 1996, the 4-Year Bachelor of Science in Psychiatric Nursing was initiated.

Between 1994 and 1997 Clark Hall and the Brandon College Building underwent renovation and reconstruction, with the retention of the original façade; these buildings house faculty and administration as well as classes. In 1997, the college initiated the School of Health Studies and a 4-Year Bachelor of Business Administration. In 1998, a Masters program in Rural Development and a bachelor's program in First Nations and Aboriginal Counselling were launched.

In 1999, the university celebrated its centennial. To mark the occasion, an excavation of the original Prairie College school site was carried out with the help of community members. The Applied Disaster and Emergency Studies program was initiated in the fall of 2001. The Health Studies Complex was opened in September 2003, to house the School of Health Studies and the First Nations and Aboriginal Counselling program. The complex includes a large round room equipped for holding traditional ceremonies performed by First Nations and Métis students.

By 2002, Brandon University had enrolment of 3,098 and a faculty of 220. The next year the Bachelor of Environmental Science program was implemented and a four-year Creative Arts program and the Bachelor of Fine Arts Program were begun. In September 2005 Brandon University's Rural and Community Studies Program expanded from its existing three-year BA program to include four-year honours, four-year major, and four-year minor Bachelor of Arts degrees.

In September 2008, a 17-day strike of the university's faculty took place. Contract negotiations broke down again in the fall of 2011, and a 45-day strike by university faculty members ensued.

In 2013, the university opened a Healthy Living Centre athletics facility, on the site of the former Kinsmen Memorial Stadium. The centre, which includes an indoor walking track, hosts the Bobcats and provides fitness facilities for students, faculty, staff, and the community.

== Faculties, schools, departments, and research centres ==
- Faculty of Arts
  - Aboriginal and Visual Arts, Anthropology, Business Administration, Drama, Economics, English, Gender and Women's Studies, History, Classical and Modern Languages, Native Studies, Philosophy, Political Science, Religion, Rural Development, Sociology
- Faculty of Education
  - Administration and Educational Services, Curriculum & Instruction: Humanities, Curriculum & Instruction: Math/Science, Department of Educational Psychology and Foundations, Physical Education, Music Education, Graduate Studies
- Faculty of Graduate Studies
  - Graduate Diploma in Education, Master in Education, Music Graduate Program, Master of Psychiatric Nursing, Master in Rural Development, Graduate Diploma in Rural Development
- Faculty of Science
  - Applied Disaster & Emergency Studies, Biology (Botany & Zoology discontinued in 2009), Chemistry, Environmental Science, Geography and Environment, Geology, Mathematics and Computer Science, Physics and Astronomy, Psychology
- Faculty of Health Studies
  - Nursing, Psychiatric Nursing, Mental Health, Indigenous Health, and Human Services, First Nations and Aboriginal Counselling
- School of Music
  - Honours (General Studies), Performance, Education, Jazz Studies, Graduate Studies in Performance, Music Education and Composition
- Research Centres
  - Rural Development Institute (RDI)
  - Environmental Science Laboratories
  - Micro Analytical Facility
  - Study of Cultural Adaptations in the Prairie Ecozone (SCAPE)
  - Brandon University Centre for Aboriginal and Rural Education (BU CARES)

Brandon University is an active member of the University of the Arctic. UArctic is an international cooperative network based in the Circumpolar Arctic region, consisting of more than 200 universities, colleges, and other organizations with an interest in promoting education and research in the Arctic region.

== Degrees and programs ==
=== Undergraduate ===
- Bachelor of Arts (BA)
- Bachelor of Business Administration (BBA)
- Bachelor of Education (BEd)
- Bachelor of Fine Arts (BFA)
- Bachelor of First Nations and Aboriginal Counselling (BFNAC)
- Bachelor of Music (BMus)
- Bachelor of Nursing (BN)
- Bachelor of Science (BSc)
- Bachelor of Science in Environmental Science (BSES)
- Bachelor of Science in Psychiatric Nursing (BScPN)

=== Graduate ===
- Master of Education (MEd)
- Master of Music (MMus)
- Master of Rural Development (MRD)
- Master in Psychiatric Nursing
- Master of Science in Environmental and Life Sciences (MSc)

=== Diplomas ===
- Graduate Diploma in Rural Development (GRD)
- Post Diploma in Mental Health (BScMN)

=== Programs ===
- Brandon University Hutterite Education Program (BUHEP)
- Program for the Education of Native Teachers (PENT)
- Community Based Education (CBE)

=== Defunct programs ===
- Brandon University Northern Teacher Education Program (BUNTEP)

== Scholarships ==
The university joined Project Hero, a scholarship program cofounded by General (Ret'd) Rick Hillier, for the families of fallen Canadian Forces members.

The Government of Canada sponsors an Aboriginal Bursaries Search Tool that lists over 680 scholarships, bursaries, and other incentives offered by governments, universities, and industry to support Aboriginal post-secondary participation. Brandon University scholarships for Aboriginal, First Nations and Métis students include: Maria Ross Scholarship; Isabelle Douglas Estate Scholarships; Manitoba Blue Cross George J. Strang Scholarship; Gerdau MRM Steel Inc. Annual Scholarship; Donna and Bill Parrish Scholarship for Aboriginal Students; Scotiabank Scholarships for Aboriginal students in financial need; Manitoba Industry, Economic Development and Mines Bursaries in Geology; First Nations Teacher Education Scholarships; Manitoba Citizens' Bursary Fund for Aboriginal Peoples; Louis Riel Institute Bursaries; Manitoba Hydro Employment Equity Bursary.

== Student activities ==
=== Athletics ===
The university's sports teams in U Sports are called the Brandon Bobcats. Brandon University competes in basketball (men/women) and volleyball (men/women). Brandon University used to field a men's hockey team in the CIAU, however, that ceased in 2000.

In the 2006–07 academic year, the Bobcats advanced to the Canadian Basketball Finals. They placed second to Carleton University, in a hard-fought 52–49 game.

In 2016, the Bobcats hosted the CIS National Women's Volleyball Championship.

=== Music ===
Music students can join the Brandon University Orchestra.

== Indigenous ==
Brandon University provides services in more remote communities. Indigenous Elders are present on campus at Brandon University to provide social support.

== Governance ==
=== Administration ===
- Chancellor – Mary Jane McCallum
- President and Vice Chancellor – Christine Bovis–Cnossen
- Provost and Vice President (Academic) – Kofi Campbell
- Vice President (Administration & Finance) – Scott Lamont

=== Deans ===
- Arts – Greg Kennedy
- Education – Alysha Ferrell
- Health Studies – Linda Ross (Acting)
- Music – Greg Gatien
- Science – Christophe LeMoine

=== Student governance ===
Brandon University students are represented by the Brandon University Students' Union (BUSU). BUSU represents undergraduate, graduate, and distance students. BUSU is a member of the Canadian Federation of Students, local 37.

The current BUSU executive is:

- President – Charles Adamu
- Vice President Operations – Michelle Williams-Joel
- Vice President Engagement – Michael Uwa-Omoregha

== University chancellors ==
- Mary Jane McCallum (2021–Present)
- Michael Decter (2013–2021)
- Henry Champ (2009–2012)
- Edward Schreyer (2002–2008)
- Kevin Kavanagh (1996–2002)
- Ronald D. Bell (1991–1996)
- Stanley Knowles (1970–1990)
- Maitland Steinkopf (1967–1970)

== University presidents ==
- Dr. Christine Bovis-Cnossen (2025-present)
- David Docherty (2019–2025)
- Steve Robinson (2017–2019)
- Gervan Fearon (2014–2017)
- Deborah Poff (2009–2014)
- Louis Visentin (2000–2009)
- Dennis Anderson (1990–2000)
- John Mallea (1985–1990)
- E. J. Tyler (1984–1985)
- Harold J. Perkins (1977–1984)
- Lloyd Dulmage (1970–1977)
- R. F. B. King (1969–1970, acting president)
- John E. Robbins (1967–1969, president Brandon University)
- John E. Robbins (1960–1967, president Brandon College)
- H. S. Perdue (1959–1960, acting president)
- Dr. J. R. C. Evans

== Notable alumni ==
- Marjorie Beaucage, Métis filmmaker
- Henry Champ, Canadian broadcast journalist
- Tommy Douglas, father of medicare and The Greatest Canadian (as voted on by CBC viewers)
- Stanley Knowles, New Democratic Party Member of Parliament
- Branden Leslie, Conservative Member of Parliament
- Frank McKinnon, sports executive and Member of Order of Canada
- Andy Murray, NHL and Team Canada head coach
- Olivia Poole, inventor of the Jolly Jumper
- Brian Pallister, Conservative Party of Canada Member of Parliament, Manitoba MLA and Premier of Manitoba
- Mike Pellicciotti, American politician and Washington State Treasurer
- H. Clare Pentland, historian at the University of Manitoba
- Neil Robertson, mathematician known for the Robertson–Seymour theorem
- John W. M. Thompson, Manitoba MLA and provincial cabinet minister

== See also ==
- Higher education in Manitoba
- Education in Canada
- List of universities in the Canadian Prairies
- U Sports
- Canadian government scientific research organizations
- Canadian university scientific research organizations
- Canadian industrial research and development organizations
