= Rural Secretariat =

Defunct government institution

- Established: 1998
- Dissolved: 2013

The Rural Secretariat was a focal point for the Government of Canada to work in partnership with Canadians in rural and remote areas to build strong, dynamic communities. It was dismantled by the Conservative government in 2013. Located in Agriculture and Agri-Food Canada, it provided leadership and coordination for the Canadian Rural Partnership; facilitated liaison and creation of partnerships around rural issues and priorities; and promoted dialogue between rural stakeholders and the federal government.

Key activities of the Rural Secretariat included:

- seeking input of rural Canadians through the Rural Dialogue so the federal government could better understand and respond to local and regional issues;
- conducting an Information Outreach program to promote awareness of federal programs and services for rural Canadians;
- promoting use of the "Rural Lens" to ensure that rural concerns were considered throughout the federal government;
- conducting and supporting research and analysis of economic and social issues affecting rural Canada;
- coordinating a partnership approach on rural issues across the federal government, through the provincial and territorial Rural Teams;
- providing one-stop access to information of particular interest to rural Canadians through the Canadian Rural Information Service.

The Minister of Agriculture and Agri-Food was responsible for the Rural Secretariat.
