= 2023 U Sports Men's Soccer Championship =

Tournament details
- Country: Canada
- Venue(s): Ness Timmons Field; Sydney, Nova Scotia
- Dates: 9–12 November 2023
- Teams: 8

Final positions
- Champions: CBU Capers (2nd title)
- Runners-up: Montreal Carabins
- Third place: UBC Thunderbirds
- Fourth place: Mount Royal Cougars

Tournament statistics
- Matches played: 11
- Goals scored: 22 (2 per match)
- Top goal scorer(s): Owen Sheppard, Tyler Attardo (3 each)

Awards
- Championship MVP: Owen Sheppard (CBU Capers)

The 2023 U Sports Men's Soccer Championship was the 51st edition of the U Sports men's soccer championship, a postseason tournament to determine the national champion of the 2023 U Sports men's soccer season. The tournament started on November 9 and ended with the bronze-medal and championship games being played on November 12 at Cape Breton University. It was the fourth tournament to be held in Nova Scotia.

Thompson Rivers WolfPack were the defending champions following their victory in 2022, however, they failed the qualify for the 2023 tournament following a quarterfinal elimination in the Canada West playoffs.

== Host ==
The tournament was held at Ness Timmons Field, on the grounds of Cape Breton University. CBU were hosting the tournament for the first time in 51 years.

== Qualified teams ==
The championship consisted of an eight-team single-elimination tournament. Four teams automatically qualified for the tournament as one of the winners of the four conferences, three qualified as the runners-ups, and one qualified as the host.

=== Participating teams ===
Team	Qualified	Last appearance	Last win
CBU Capers	Host	2022	2017
St. Francis Xavier X-Men	AUS champions	2022	Never
Carleton Ravens	OUA champions	2021	Never
York Lions	OUA finalists	2019	2015
Montréal Carabins	RSEQ champions	2022	2021
UQTR Patriotes	RSEQ finalists	2022	2019
Mount Royal Cougars	Canada West champions	None	Never
UBC Thunderbirds	Canada West finalists	2022	2013

=== Seeding ===
The conference champions were allocated seeds 1 through 4, with the additional teams (conference runners-up or host team) allocated seeds 5 through 8. Ideally, seed 1 plays seed 8, seed 2 plays seed 7, seed 3 plays seed 6, and seed 4 plays seed 5, however, the bracket may be adjusted in the interest of avoiding an intra-conference matchup in the first round.

Pos	Conf.	Team	Reg. Season	Playoffs
1	CW	Mount Royal Cougars	11–2–1	3–0–0
2	AUS	St. Francis Xavier X-Men	9–2–1	2–0–0
3	OUS	Carleton Ravens	10–1–1	2–0–1
4	RSEQ	UQTR Patriotes	6–5–1	2–0–0
5	AUS	CBU Capers (H)	9–0–3	1–1–0
6	RSEQ	Montreal Carabins	9–0–3	1–1–0
7	CW	UBC Thunderbirds	13–1–2	2–1–0
8	OUS	York Lions	7–2–3	1–1–1

Updated to match(es) played on 4 November 2023. Source: Standings
(H) Host

== Bracket ==
5th place match
8	York Lions	3
2	St. Francis Xavier X-Men	1

Consolation semi-finals
8	York Lions (p)	0 (4)
4	UQTR Patriotes	0 (3)
2	St. Francis Xavier X-Men	2
3	Carleton Ravens	1

Quarter-finals
1	Mount Royal Cougars	1
8	York Lions	0
4	UQTR Patriotes	2 (2)
5	CBU Capers (p)	2 (3)
2	St. Francis Xavier X-Men	1
7	UBC Thunderbirds	2
3	Carleton Ravens	1 (4)
6	Montreal Carabins (p)	1 (5)

Semi-finals
1	Mount Royal Cougars	0
5	CBU Capers	1
7	UBC Thunderbirds	0
6	Montreal Carabins	2

Final
5	CBU Capers	1
6	Montreal Carabins	0
3rd place match
1	Mount Royal Cougars	0
7	UBC Thunderbirds	1

== Results ==
=== Day 1 ===
==== Quarter-finals ====
November 9th Match A	Mount Royal Cougars	1–0	York Lions	Sydney, Nova Scotia
7:30pm	Miguel Da Rocha 89'	Report		Stadium: Cape Breton University; Attendance: 0 (Note: Match report claims that there were 0 spectators in attendance, however, spectators were clearly visible in live streams broadcast by the CBC.); Referee: Mario Al-Ayass

November 9th Match B	CBU Capers	2–2 (a.e.t.) (4–2 p)	UQTR Patriotes	Sydney, Nova Scotia
5:00pm	Owen Sheppard 21', 32'	Report	Vincent Lamy 77'; Mahdi Abbassi 90+'	Stadium: Cape Breton University; Attendance: 0 Referee: Niko Jecanski
	Penalties
	Jason Hartill (penalty scored); Jamie Nicholson (penalty scored); Owen Sheppard (penalty scored); Benjamin Fortuin (penalty scored)		(penalty missed) Vincent Lamy; (penalty scored) Emile Boivin; (penalty scored) Thomas Sire; (penalty missed) Samuel Laplante

November 9th Match C	St. Francis Xavier X-Men	1–2	UBC Thunderbirds	Sydney, Nova Scotia
1:30pm	Lewis Dye 74'	Report	Sebastian Dzikowski 45'; Luke Norman 52'	Stadium: Cape Breton University; Attendance: 0 Referee: Seb Noshinravari

November 9th Match D	Carleton Ravens	1–1 (a.e.t.) (4–5 p)	Montreal Carabins	Sydney, Nova Scotia
11:00am	Jordan Tisseur (red card) 57'; Daniel Assaf 59'	Report	Quentin Paumier 33'	Stadium: Cape Breton University; Attendance: 0 Referee: Ryan Schwenger
	Penalties
	Raphael Garcia (penalty scored); Daniel Assaf (penalty missed); Luca Piccioli (penalty scored); Eric Yoseke (penalty scored); Tareq Hamad (penalty missed); Kevin Kaba (penalty scored); Yusuf Osman (penalty missed)		(penalty missed) Kareem Sow; (penalty scored) Quentin Paumier; (penalty scored) Paul Mortas; (penalty scored) Julien Bruce; (penalty missed) Adam Benmoussa; (penalty scored) Theo O'Poulin; (penalty scored) Olivier Dianson

=== Day 2 ===
==== Consolation Semi-finals ====
November 10th Match E	York Lions	0–0 (a.e.t.) (4–3 p)	UQTR Patriotes	Sydney, Nova Scotia
1:30pm		Report		Stadium: Cape Breton University; Attendance: 0 Referee: Ryan Schwenger
	Penalties
	Isaac Bradbury (penalty scored); Chris Melino (penalty missed); Christian Zeppieri (penalty scored); Tyler Attardo (penalty scored); Gabe Poles (penalty scored)		Siméon Laland (penalty scored); Etienne Bertrand (penalty scored); Thomas Sire (penalty scored); Vincent Lamy (penalty missed); Nicolas Desjardins (penalty missed)

November 10th Match F	St. Francis Xavier X-Men	2–1	Carleton Ravens	Sydney, Nova Scotia
11:00am	Samuel Barrowcliffe 1'; Blake Fenton 88'	Report	Brady Curkovic 90'	Stadium: Cape Breton University; Attendance: 0 Referee: Scott Decker

==== Semi-finals ====
November 10th Match G	CBU Capers	1–0	Mount Royal Cougars	Sydney, Nova Scotia
6:30pm	Owen Sheppard 71'	Report		Stadium: Cape Breton University; Attendance: 0 Referee: Mario Al-Ayass

November 10th Match H	UBC Thunderbirds	0–2	Montreal Carabins	Sydney, Nova Scotia
4:00pm		Report	Yohan Le bourhis 80'; Sami McDuff 81'	Stadium: Cape Breton University; Attendance: 0 Referee: Niko Jecanski

=== Day 3 ===
==== 5th place match ====
November 11th Match I	York Lions	3–1	St. Francis Xavier X-Men	Sydney, Nova Scotia
1:00pm	Tyler Attardo 34', 86', 90'	Report	Logan Rieck 39'	Stadium: Cape Breton University; Attendance: 0 Referee: Scott Decker

=== Day 4 ===
==== 3rd place match ====
November 12th Match J	Mount Royal Cougars	0–1	UBC Thunderbirds	Sydney, Nova Scotia
11:00am	Sjard Strauss (red card) 90'	Report	Luke Norman 26'	Stadium: Cape Breton University; Attendance: 0 Referee: Seb. Noshinravari

==== Final ====
November 12th Match K	CBU Capers	1–0	Montreal Carabins	Sydney, Nova Scotia
2:00pm	Jacob Spizzirri 45'	Report		Stadium: Cape Breton University; Attendance: 0 Referee: Mario Al-Ayass

== Statistics ==
=== Goalscorers ===
There have been 22 goals scored in 11 matches, for an average of 2 goals per match.

3 goals

- Tyler Attardo – York
- Owen Sheppard – Cape Breton

2 goals

- Luke Norman – UBC

1 goal

- Miguel Da Rocha – Mount Royal
- Vincent Lamy – UQTR
- Mahdi Abbassi – UQTR
- Lewis Dye – St. Francis Xavier
- Sebastian Dzikowski – UBC
- Daniel Asaff – Carleton
- Quentin Paumier – Montreal
- Samuel Barrowcliffe – St. Francis Xavier
- Blake Fenton – St. Francis Xavier
- Brady Curkovic – Carleton
- Yohan Le Bourhis – Montreal
- Sami McDuff – Montreal
- Logan Rieck – St. Francis Xavier
- Jacob Spizzirri – Cape Breton

== See also ==
- 2023 CPL–U Sports Draft
- 2024 CPL–U Sports Draft
