= Joe Johnson Memorial Trophy =

Canadian amateur men's soccer award

- Competition: U Sports men's soccer
- Awarded for: Player of the year
- Country: Canada
- Presented by: U Sports

History
- First award: 1991
- First winner: Rob Reed
- Most recent: Mateo Brazinha (2025)
- Website: usports.ca/en/awards/sport-awards%20usports.ca

The Joe Johnson Memorial Trophy is awarded annually to the most outstanding U Sports men's soccer player. The trophy was donated by the family of the longtime university soccer coach in memory of his contribution to university soccer. The selection is made by a committee composed of members of the U Sports Men’s Soccer Coaches Association and is presented at the U Sports men's soccer championship.

== List of past winners ==
Year	Winner	School
1991	Rob Reed	UBC Thunderbirds
1992	Dana Peoples	McMaster Marauders
1993	Kevin Hearne	UBC Thunderbirds
1994	David McDonald	Laurentian Voyageurs
1995	Jocelyn Roy	UQTR Patriotes
1996	Paul English	Dalhousie Tigers
1997	Theo Zagar	Toronto Varsity Blues
1998	Glen Miller	UPEI Panthers
1999	Michael Potts	Western Ontario Mustangs
2000	Michael Potts	Western Ontario Mustangs
2001	Mesut Mert	Saint Mary's Huskies
2002	Aaron Richer	UBC Thunderbirds
2003	Mesut Mert	Saint Mary's Huskies
2004	Boubacar Coulibaly	Montreal Carabins
2005	Ryan Anstey	UPEI Panthers
2006	Mike Bialy	Toronto Varsity Blues
2007	Nick Perugini	Trinity Western Spartans
2008	Francesco Bruno	York Lions
2009	Paul Hamilton	Trinity Western Spartans
2010	Julien Priol	Laval Rouge et Or
2011	Robbie Murphy	Guelph Gryphons
2012	Samuel Georget	Laval Rouge et Or
2013	Alex Braletic	Ryerson Rams
2014	Justin Maheu	Cape Breton Capers
2015	Cam Hundal	Victoria Vikes
2016	Jonathan Lao	York Lions
2017	Dan Hayfield	St. Francis Xavier X-Men
2018	Jace Kotsopoulos	Guelph Gryphons
2019	Aboubacar Sissoko	Montreal Carabins
2020	No award due to COVID-19 pandemic	
2021	Guy-Frank Essomé Penda	Montreal Carabins
2022	Christopher Campoli	Ontario Tech Ridgebacks
2023	Sebastian Dzikowski	UBC Thunderbirds
2024	Christian Zeppieri	York Lions
2025	Mateo Brazinha	UFV Cascades

== See also ==
- U Sports men's soccer championship MVP
