= 2026 U Sports Men's Soccer Championship =

Tournament details
- Country: Canada
- City: Victoria, British Columbia
- Venue: Centennial Stadium
- Dates: November 12–15, 2026
- Teams: 8

Final positions
- Champions: Victoria Vikes
- Runners-up: Montréal Carabins
- Third place: Alberta Golden Bears
- Fourth place: UBC Thunderbirds

Tournament statistics
- Matches played: 11
- Goals scored: 22 (2 per match)
- Attendance: 8,800 (800 per match)
- Top goal scorer: Maher Fares (3)

Awards
- Championship MVP: Alex Moody

The 2026 U Sports Men's Soccer Championship was the 54th edition of the U Sports men's soccer championship, a postseason tournament to determine the national champion of the 2026 U Sports men's soccer season. The tournament was played November 12–15, 2026 at Centennial Stadium on the campus of University of Victoria.

== Host ==
The tournament was held at Centennial Stadium on the campus of University of Victoria. This was the 5th U Sports men's soccer championship hosted at the University of Victoria, having previously hosted in 1975, 1978, 1999, and 2011.

== Format ==
The championship consisted of an eight-team single-elimination tournament. The four conference champions and the hosts, the Victoria Vikes, were guaranteed places. The three additional berths were allocated one each to Canada West, RSEQ, and OUA, according to their conference qualification processes. AUS received one berth, awarded to its conference champion.

Teams were permitted a maximum of 18 team personnel in the bench area, up to 11 of which may be named substitutes. Teams were permitted 6 substitutions, along with unlimited at half-time, and if applicable, prior to and at half-time of extra time; reentry of substituted players was allowed. The concussion substitution rule was also in effect.

For the quarter-finals, semi-finals, and final, draws were settled by 30 minutes of extra time and, if required, a penalty shoot-out. For the consolation semi-finals, fifth-place match, and third-place match, draws were settled directly by a penalty shoot-out.

== Teams ==
=== Qualified teams ===
Team	Conf.	Qualified as	Qualified on	Last appearance	Last win
Victoria Vikes	CW	Hosts	February 27, 2025	2021	2011
Cape Breton Capers	AUS	Conference champions	November 1, 2026	2025	2023
UBC Thunderbirds	CW	Conference champions	November 1, 2026	2025	2024
TMU Bold	OUA	Conference champions	October 31, 2026	2022	None
McGill Redbirds	RSEQ	Conference champions	November 5, 2026	2024	1997
Alberta Golden Bears	CW	Conference runners-up	November 1, 2026	2016	2016
Guelph Gryphons	OUA	Conference runners-up	October 31, 2026	2021	None
Montreal Carabins	RSEQ	Conference regular season winners	October 18, 2026	2025	2021

=== Seeding ===
Following the conference championships, the eight teams were seeded using the most recent Elo rankings. Each conference champion must have been the highest-seeded team from its conference and must have been seeded in the top six. First-round matchups between the top two qualifiers from the same conference were avoided.

Pos	Conf.	Team	Regular season	Playoffs	Pct
1	CW	UBC Thunderbirds	13–0–2	3–0–0	.944
2	AUS	Cape Breton Capers	8–3–1	2–0–0	.750
3	OUA	TMU Bold	7–2–3	2–0–1	.733
4	CW	Victoria Vikes (H)	8–4–3	1–1–0	.618
5	RSEQ	McGill Redbirds	7–3–2	1–0–1	.679
6	RSEQ	Montreal Carabins	8–1–3	0–1–0	.731
7	CW	Alberta Golden Bears	5–4–5	2–1–0	.559
8	OUA	Guelph Gryphons	5–4–3	2–1–1	.563

Source: U Sports
(H) Host

== Bracket ==
Fifth-place match
McGill Redbirds	3
TMU Bold	1

Consolation semi-finals
Guelph Gryphons	2 (0)
McGill Redbirds (p)	2 (2)
Cape Breton Capers	0
TMU Bold	1

Quarter-finals
1	UBC Thunderbirds	3
8	Guelph Gryphons	0
4	Victoria Vikes (a.e.t.)	1
5	McGill Redbirds	0
2	Cape Breton Capers	0
7	Alberta Golden Bears	1
3	TMU Bold	0
6	Montreal Carabins	1

Semi-finals
UBC Thunderbirds	0
Victoria Vikes (a.e.t.)	1
Alberta Golden Bears	0
Montreal Carabins	2

Final
Victoria Vikes (a.e.t.)	1
Montreal Carabins
Third-place match
UBC Thunderbirds	1
Alberta Golden Bears	2

== Results ==
=== Quarter-finals ===
November 12, 2026
11:00 am

TMU Bold	0–1	Montreal Carabins
	Report	Oberhuber-Poulin 46'

Centennial Stadium, Victoria, BC
Attendance: 750
Referee: Amer Ramic

November 12, 2026
1:30 pm

Cape Breton Capers	0–1	Alberta Golden Bears
	Report	Minty 4'

Centennial Stadium, Victoria, BC
Attendance: 450
Referee: David Harrison

November 12, 2026
4:30 pm

UBC Thunderbirds	3–0	Guelph Gryphons
Herbert 67', 75'; Agerskov 86'	Report

Centennial Stadium, Victoria, BC
Attendance: 450
Referee: Nicolas Melita

November 12, 2026
7:15 pm

Victoria Vikes	1–0 (a.e.t.)	McGill Redbirds
Goertzen 105'	Report

Centennial Stadium, Victoria, BC
Attendance: 1,150
Referee: Laurent Cousineau

=== Consolation semi-finals ===
November 13, 2026
11:00 am

Cape Breton Capers	0–1	TMU Bold
	Report	Kerr-Cooper 22'

Centennial Stadium, Victoria, BC
Attendance: 400
Referee: David Harrison

November 13, 2026
1:30 pm

McGill Redbirds	2–2	Guelph Gryphons
Fares 10' (pen.), 12'	Report	Alfieri 7'; Chen 58'
Penalties
Sanghera-Gula (penalty missed); Yee (penalty scored); Minchillo (penalty missed); Sordet (penalty scored)	2–0	(penalty missed) Tinmouth; (penalty missed) Pender; (penalty missed) Boursiquot; (penalty missed) Rioux

Centennial Stadium, Victoria, BC
Attendance: 500
Referee: Amer Ramic

=== Semi-finals ===
November 13, 2026
4:30 pm

Montreal Carabins	2–0	Alberta Golden Bears
Touil 56'; Godbout 82'	Report

Centennial Stadium, Victoria, BC
Attendance: 500
Referee: Laurent Cousineau

November 13, 2026
7:15 pm

Victoria Vikes	1–0 (a.e.t.)	UBC Thunderbirds
Lupton 104'	Report

Centennial Stadium, Victoria, BC
Attendance: 750
Referee: Cody Baldauf

=== Fifth-place match ===
November 14, 2026
1:30 pm

TMU Bold	1–3	McGill Redbirds
Ihama 79'	Report	Dallery 22'; Fares 25'; Noko 73'

Centennial Stadium, Victoria, BC
Attendance: 100
Referee: Amer Ramic

=== Third-place match ===
November 15, 2026
11:00 am

UBC Thunderbirds	1–2	Alberta Golden Bears
Rukavina 12'	Report	Artunduaga 70'; Blight 88'

Centennial Stadium, Victoria, BC
Attendance: 250
Referee: Cody Baldauf

=== Final ===
November 15, 2026
2:00 pm

Victoria Vikes	1–0 (a.e.t.)	Montreal Carabins
Pearse 116'	Report

Centennial Stadium, Victoria, BC
Attendance: 3,500
Referee: Nicolas Melita

== See also ==
- 2026 U Sports Women's Soccer Championship
- 2027 CPL–U Sports Draft
