= 2025 U Sports Men's Soccer Championship =

Tournament details
- Country: Canada
- Cities: Toronto, Ontario
- Venue: Varsity Stadium
- Dates: November 6–9, 2025
- Teams: 8

Final positions
- Champions: York Lions
- Runners-up: Mount Royal Cougars
- Third place: Montreal Carabins
- Fourth place: UQTR Patriotes

Tournament statistics
- Matches played: 11
- Goals scored: 39 (3.55 per match)
- Attendance: 6,902 (627 per match)
- Top goal scorer: Christian Zeppieri (4 goals)

Awards
- Championship MVP: Christian Zeppieri (York)

The 2025 U Sports Men's Soccer Championship was the 53rd edition of the U Sports men's soccer championship, a postseason tournament to determine the national champion of the 2025 U Sports men's soccer season. The tournament was played November 6–9, 2025 at Varsity Stadium on the St. George campus of the University of Toronto.

== Host ==
The tournament was held at Varsity Stadium on the St. George campus of the University of Toronto. This was the 3rd U Sports men's soccer championship event hosted at the University of Toronto.

== Qualified teams ==
The championship consisted of an eight-team single-elimination tournament. One team automatically qualified as the hosts, four teams automatically qualified as winners of each of the four conferences, and the three non-hosting conferences were each assigned an additional berth.

=== Participating teams ===
Team	Conf.	Qualified as (conference result)	Qualified on	Last appearance	Last win
Toronto Varsity Blues	OUA	Hosts (Note: Toronto also won the OUA conference championship.)	October 17, 2024	2016	1988
Dalhousie Tigers	AUS	Champions	October 24, 2025	2008	1995
Mount Royal Cougars	CW	Champions	October 26, 2025	2024	None
Montreal Carabins	RSEQ	Champions	October 24, 2025	2024	2021
Cape Breton Capers	AUS	Runners-up	October 24, 2025	2023	2023
UBC Thunderbirds	CW	Runners-up	October 26, 2025	2024	2024
York Lions	OUA	Runners-up	October 25, 2025	2024	2015
UQTR Patriotes	RSEQ	Regular season winners	October 17, 2025	2019	2019

=== Seeding ===
After the conference championships, the four conference champions were seeded in positions one through four based on their final ranking. The remaining four teams were then placed in the bracket to avoid intraconference matchups in the first two rounds and to avoid pairs of matchups from similar conferences.

Pos	Conf.	Team	Reg. season	Playoffs	Pct
1	OUA	Toronto Varsity Blues (H)	10–1–1	3–0–0	.900
2	RSEQ	Montreal Carabins	7–2–3	2–0–0	.750
3	AUS	Dalhousie Tigers	8–2–2	2–0–0	.786
4	CW	Mount Royal Cougars	7–3–4	2–0–1	.676
5	AUS	Cape Breton Capers	9–1–2	1–1–0	.786
6	OUA	York Lions	9–1–2	1–1–1	.767
7	CW	UBC Thunderbirds	15–0–1	2–1–0	.921
8	RSEQ	UQTR Patriotes	9–0–3	0–1–0	.808

Source: Seeding
(H) Host

== Bracket ==
Fifth-place match
Toronto Varsity Blues	1
UBC Thunderbirds	2

Consolation semi-finals
Toronto Varsity Blues	5
Cape Breton Capers	0
UBC Thunderbirds	3
Dalhousie Tigers	0

Quarter-finals
1	Toronto Varsity Blues	2
8	UQTR Patriotes (a.e.t.)	3
4	Mount Royal Cougars	2
5	Cape Breton Capers	1
2	Montreal Carabins	2
7	UBC Thunderbirds	1
3	Dalhousie Tigers	1
6	York Lions	5

Semi-finals
UQTR Patriotes	0
Mount Royal Cougars	2
Montreal Carabins	0
York Lions	2

Final
Mount Royal Cougars	0
York Lions (a.e.t.)	1
Third-place match
UQTR Patriotes	1
Montreal Carabins	5

== Results ==
=== Quarter-finals ===
November 6, 2025
11:00 am

Dalhousie Tigers	1–5	York Lions
Christmas 89' (pen.)	Report	Zeppieri 3', 44'; Robinson 8'; Odume 64' (o.g.); Fidalgo 69'

Varsity Stadium, Toronto, Ontario
Attendance: 3,100
Referee: Mo Mohseni
November 6, 2025
1:30 pm

Montreal Carabins	2–1	UBC Thunderbirds
Filion 19'; Cohen 74'	Report	Afework 21'

Varsity Stadium, Toronto, Ontario
Attendance: 150
Referee: Nivin Raizada
November 6, 2025
4:00 pm

Mount Royal Cougars	2–1	Cape Breton Capers
Walter 17'; Chanda 84'	Report	Bayo 56'

Varsity Stadium, Toronto, Ontario
Attendance: 100
Referee: Thomas Noël
November 6, 2025
7:00 pm

Toronto Varsity Blues	2–3 (a.e.t.)	UQTR Patriotes
Osorio 25'; Grey 57'	Report	Marcoux 2'; Boivin 41'; Ndiaye 96'

Varsity Stadium, Toronto, Ontario
Referee: Cody Baldauf

=== Consolation semi-finals ===
November 7, 2025
11:00 am

Dalhousie Tigers	0–3	UBC Thunderbirds
	Report	Norman 26'; Comsia 56'; Rukavina 81'

Varsity Stadium, Toronto, Ontario
Attendance: 2,800
Referee: Cody Baldauf
November 7, 2025
1:30 pm

Toronto Varsity Blues	5–0	Cape Breton Capers
Schifano 17'; Scurti 55', 74'; Hallam 71'; Prested 84'	Report

Varsity Stadium, Toronto, Ontario
Attendance: 102
Referee: Josh Gall

=== Semi-finals ===
November 7, 2025
4:00 pm

Montreal Carabins	0–2	York Lions
	Report	Zeppieri 16' (pen.); Benmoussa 56' (o.g.)

Varsity Stadium, Toronto, Ontario
Referee: Thomas Noël
November 7, 2025
7:00 pm

Mount Royal Cougars	2–0	UQTR Patriotes
Chanda 17' (pen.), 72'	Report

Varsity Stadium, Toronto, Ontario
Referee: Mo Mohseni

=== Fifth-place match ===
November 8, 2025
5:00 pm

Toronto Varsity Blues	1–2	UBC Thunderbirds
Osorio 90'	Report	Dent 57'; Godbout 63'

Varsity Stadium, Toronto, Ontario
Attendance: 150
Referee: Nivin Raizada

=== Third-place match ===
November 9, 2025
11:00 am

Montreal Carabins	5–1	UQTR Patriotes
El Kalkouli 2'; McDuff 21', 29'; Malo 45+2'; Touil 68'	Report	Marcoux 31'

Varsity Stadium, Toronto, Ontario
Attendance: 50
Referee: Cody Baldauf

=== Final ===
November 9, 2025
2:00 pm

Mount Royal Cougars	0–1 (a.e.t.)	York Lions
	Report	Zeppieri 116' (pen.)

Varsity Stadium, Toronto, Ontario
Attendance: 450
Referee: Mo Mohseni

== Statistics ==
=== Final standings ===
Pos	Team	W–L	GF	GA	GD
1st	York Lions	3–0	8	1	+7
2nd	Mount Royal Cougars	2–1	4	2	+2
3rd	Montreal Carabins	2–1	7	4	+3
4th	UQTR Patriotes	1–2	4	9	–5
5th	UBC Thunderbirds	2–1	6	3	+3
6th	Toronto Varsity Blues	1–2	8	5	+3
7th*	Cape Breton Capers	0–2	1	7	–6
8th*	Dalhousie Tigers	0–2	1	8	–7

* No seventh-place game was held. Ranking of 7th and 8th is unofficial based on the goal difference of each losing consolation-semifinalist.

=== Goalscorers ===
There were 39 goals scored in 11 matches, for an average of 3.55 goals per match.

4 goals

- Christian Zeppieri – York

3 goals

- Chanan Chanda – Mount Royal

2 goals

- Sami McDuff – Montreal
- Michael Osorio – Toronto
- Gianluca Scurti – Toronto
- Alexandre Marcoux – UQTR

1 goal

- Amadou Bayo – Cape Breton
- Orene Cohen – Montreal
- Omar El Kalkouli – Montreal
- Maxime Filion – Montreal
- Xavier Malo – Montreal
- Quentin Touil – Montreal
- Jonathan Walter – Mount Royal
- Jordan Grey – Toronto
- Niklas Hallam – Toronto
- Jacob Prested – Toronto
- Andrea Schifano – Toronto
- Theo Afework – UBC
- Max Comsia – UBC
- Kyle Dent – UBC
- Henri Godbout – UBC
- Luke Norman – UBC
- Markus Rukavina – UBC
- Emile Boivin – UQTR
- Mouhamed Ndiaye – UQTR
- Mykeo Christmas – York
- James Fidalgo – York
- Ryan Robinson – York

1 own goal

- Joseph Odume – Dalhousie (against York)
- Adam Benmoussa – Montreal (against York)

== See also ==
- 2025 U Sports Women's Soccer Championship
- 2026 CPL–U Sports Draft
