= 2022 U Sports Men's Soccer Championship =

Soccer tournament

Tournament details
- Country: Canada
- Venue(s): Hillside Stadium; Kamloops, British Columbia
- Dates: 10–13 November 2022
- Teams: 8

Final positions
- Champions: Thompson Rivers (1st title)
- Runners-up: UBC
- Third place: Montréal Carabins
- All statistics correct as of 13 November 2022.

The 2022 U Sports Men's Soccer Championship was the 50th edition of the U Sports men's soccer championship, a postseason tournament to determine the national champion of the 2022 U Sports men's soccer season. The tournament started on November 10 and ended with the bronze-medal and championship games being played on November 13 in Kamloops, British Columbia.

== Venue ==
The tournament was held at Hillside Stadium, on the grounds of Thompson Rivers University. TRU last hosted the tournament in 2017, when they defeated perennial rival UBC on penalty kicks.

== Qualification ==
The championship consisted of an eight-team single-elimination tournament. Four teams automatically qualified for the tournament as one of the winners of the four conferences, three qualified as the runners-ups, and one qualified as the host.

=== Participating teams ===
Seed	Team	Qualified	Record
1	CBU Capers	AUS champions	10–0–2
2	Montréal Carabins	RSEQ champions	9–1–2
3	UBC Thunderbirds	Canada West champions	9–3–3
4	McMaster Marauders	OUA champions	8–3–1
5	Thompson Rivers WolfPack	Host	7–3–5
6	TMU Bold	OUA finalists	9–3–0
7	St. Francis Xavier X-Men	AUS finalists	7–3–2
8	UQTR Patriotes	RSEQ finalists	7–3–2

== Bracket ==
The bracket was announced on Sunday, November 6, 2022.

First Round: November 10
1	CBU	2
8	UQTR	0
4	McMaster	1
5	Thompson Rivers	2
2	Montreal	3
7	STFX	0
3	UBC	4
6	TMU	0

Semi-Finals: November 11
1	CBU	2
5	Thompson Rivers (p)	2
2	Montreal	0
3	UBC	3

Championship Game: November 12
3	UBC	1
5	Thompson Rivers (p)	1
Bronze-Medal Game: November 12
1	CBU	0
2	Montreal	3

== See also ==
- 2022 CPL–U Sports Draft
- 2023 CPL–U Sports Draft
- U Sports men's soccer championship
- U Sports men's soccer
