= UBC Thunderbirds men's soccer =

- Founded: 1918; 108 years ago
- University: University of British Columbia
- Head coach: Mike Mosher (31st. season)
- Conference: CWUAA; I Division
- Location: Vancouver, British Columbia, Canada
- Stadium: Thunderbird Stadium (capacity: 3,500)
- Nickname: Thunderbirds
- Colors: Blue and gold
Home	Away

U Sports National Championship titles
- 1974, 1984, 1985, 1986, 1989, 1990, 1991, 1992, 1994, 2005, 2007, 2012, 2013, 2024

U Sports National Championship appearances
- 1974, 1976, 1984, 1985, 1986, 1989, 1990, 1991, 1992, 1992, 1993, 1994, 1997, 2001, 2005, 2007, 2010, 2012, 2013, 2015, 2016, 2017, 2018, 2019, 2021, 2022, 2023, 2024, 2025, 2026

Conference tournament championships
- 1974, 1976, 1985, 1986, 1989, 1990, 1991, 1992, 1993, 1994, 1997, 2001, 2010, 2013, 2015, 2017, 2018, 2019, 2021, 2022, 2024

The UBC Thunderbirds men's soccer is the intercollegiate varsity soccer team representing the University of British Columbia (UBC), located in Vancouver. The team is a member of the Canada West Universities Athletic Association (CWUAA) of U Sports Division I.

The Thunderbirds' current head coach is Mike Mosher, who is in charge since 1996 has leaded the team to a record of 5 national and 12 Canada West championships. He was also named "Coach of the Year" two times (national) and four times (conference).

The team play their home matches at the Thunderbird Stadium, with capacity for 3,500 spectators, which also serves as home venue to the women's team.

Established in 1918, the UBC soccer program has won 14 national championships, and 17 conference titles.

== Players ==
=== Current roster ===
As of January 2026

Note: Flags indicate national team as defined under FIFA eligibility rules; some limited exceptions apply. Players may hold more than one non-FIFA nationality.

No.	Pos.	Nation	Player
1	GK	CAN	Jack Garner
2	DF	CAN	Cameron Hajdu
3	DF	CAN	Joshua Tomé
4	DF	CAN	Marcus Puhalj
5	DF	CAN	Lars Gierull
6	MF	TAI	Yu-Hsuan Yuan
7	FW	CAN	Henri Godbout
8	FW	CAN	Theo Afework
9	FW	CAN	Max Comsia
10	FW	CAN	Tomas Pena
11	MF	CAN	Brennen Fuerst
12	MF	CAN	Joven Mann
13	DF	CAN	Eric Lajeunesse
14	MF	CAN	Oliver Herbert

No.	Pos.	Nation	Player
16	MF	CAN	Sebastian Agerskov
17	FW	CAN	Asvin Chauhan
18	DF	CAN	Josh Njongwe
19	DF	CAN	Adriano Carvalheiro
20	FW	CAN	Kyle Dent
21	MF	CAN	Nicolas Nadeau
22	GK	CAN	Roko Vukic
23	FW	CAN	Josiah Walter
24	MF	CAN	Luke Norman
27	FW	CAN	Markus Rukavina
28	MF	CAN	Markus Kaiser
30	GK	CAN	Hayden Franks
31	FW	CAN	Brandon Momotani

=== Players in the pros ===
UBC professional players

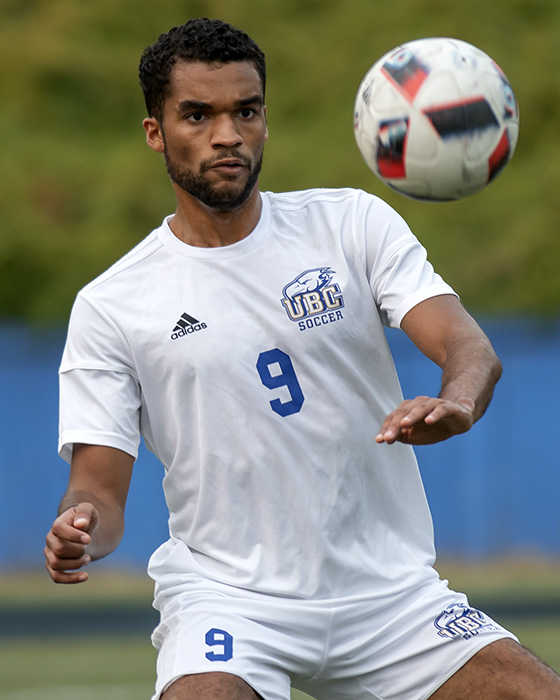
Caleb Clarke

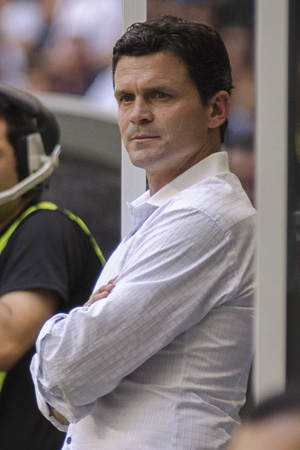
Mark Watson

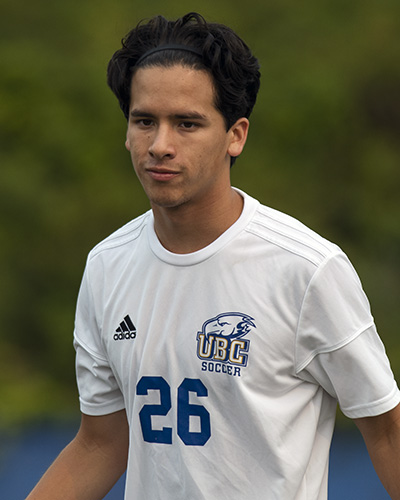
Thomas Gardner

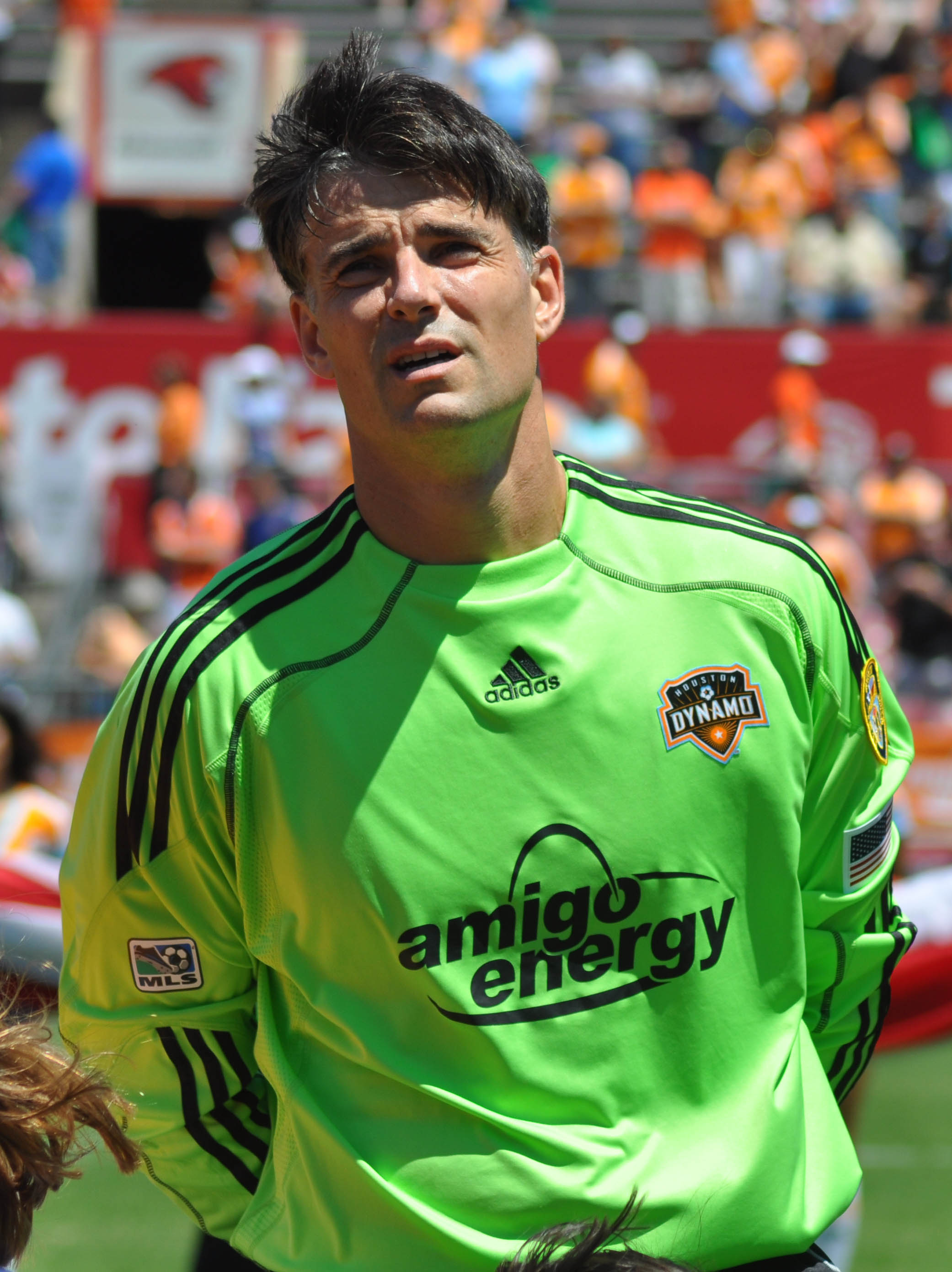
Pat Onstad

- (Canada) Nico Berg
- (Canada) Jim Berry
- (Canada) Brian Budd (Note: Member of the Ontario Sport Hall of Fame.)
- (Canada) Rick Celebrini
- (Canada) Caleb Clarke
- (Canada) Jack Cowan (Note: Member of the BC Sport Hall of Fame.)
- (Scotland) Paul Dailly
- (Socialist Federal Republic of Yugoslavia) Srdjan Djekanovic
- (Canada) Gagan Dosanjh
- (Canada) Sebastian Dzikowski
- (Canada) Jackson Farmer
- (Canada) Chris Franks
- (Canada) Mike Franks
- (Canada) Thomas Gardner
- (Canada) Felix Gelt
- (United States) Henri Godbout
- (Canada) Jordan Haynes
- (Canada) Markus Kaiser
- (Germany) Navid Mashinchi
- (Canada) Patrick Metcalfe
- (Australia) Kent O'Connor
- (Canada) Giuliano Oliviero
- (Canada) Pat Onstad
- (Canada) Mark Rogers
- (Canada) Darryl Samson
- (Canada) Chris Șerban
- (Canada) Boris Si
- (Canada) Zach Verhoven
- (Canada) Mark Watson
- (Canada) Greg Weber
- (Canada) Ken Whitehead

== Coaches ==
=== Current staff ===
As of January 2026

Position	Name
Head coach	Mike Mosher
Assoc. head coach	Joe Zupo
Assist. coach	Barson Man Ho Tin
Assist. coach	Jordano Pinto

=== Coaching history ===
#	Name	Seas.	Tenure
–	(no coach)	5	1918–22
1	E.A. Lloyd	4	1922–25
2	Alex Fordyce	2	1925–26
–	(no coach)	9	1926–34
3	Charlie Hitchens	9	1934–42
4	Laurie Baker	4	1942–45
5	Millar McGill	4	1945–48
6	Geoffrey Davies	2	1948–49
7	Gordie Baum	2	1949–50
8	A.E. Richman	2	1950–51

#	Name	Seas.	Tenure
9	Ivan Carr	2	1951–52
10	Ed Luckett	6	1952–57
11	Frank Kurucz	4	1957–60
12	Roy Nosella	2	1960–61
13	Joe Johnson	26	1961–86
14	Dick Mosher	7	1986–92
15	David Partridge	2	1992–93
–	Dick Mosher (Note: Second tenure.)	4	1993–96
16	Mike Mosher	31	1996–present

== Stadium ==
UBC play their home matches at Thunderbird Stadium, which is primarily used by the UBC football team. It seats 3,500 in the main grandstand, plus grass seating for about 5,000 people on the west side and ends of the stadium, and by using the surrounding grass embankment the facility can accommodate up to 12,000 spectators.

The stadium was opened on October 7, 1967. The facility has been also used for rugby union international matches and championships, and Australian rules football matches, including the West Coast Challenge tournament.

== Honours ==
=== National ===
Competition	Titles	Winning years
U Sports championship	14	1974, 1984, 1985, 1986, 1989, 1990, 1991, 1992, 1994, 2005, 2007, 2012, 2013, 2024

=== Conference ===
Conference	Competition	Titles	Winning years
Canada West	Division I	21	1974, 1976, 1985, 1986, 1989, 1990, 1991, 1992, 1993, 1994, 1997, 2001, 2010, 2013, 2015, 2017, 2018, 2019, 2021, 2022, 2024
