= 2008 CIS Men's Soccer Championship =

The 2008 CIS Men's Soccer Championship Finals were held from the 6-9 November, 2008 at Carleton University in Ottawa, Ontario. It consisted of 8 teams from the various conferences under the Canadian Interuniversity Sport. The breakdown was host (Carleton), 2 from the OUA, 2 from QSSF, 2 from Canada West and 1 from the AUS.

== All-Canadians ==
First Team(1-11) and Second Team(12-22) with school and hometown. Note: Flags indicate national team as defined under FIFA eligibility rules; some limited exceptions apply. Players may hold more than one non-FIFA nationality.

No.	Pos.	Nation	Player
1	GK	CAN	Gerardo Argento (Montreal - Montreal, QC)
2	DF	FRA	Augustin Nechad (Montreal - Rueil Malmaison, France)
3	DF	CAN	Graham Smith (UBC - Abbotsford, BC)
4	DF	CAN	Jonathan McNeil (Saint Mary's - Halifax, N.S.)
5	MF	CAN	Gerard Ladiyou (York - Burlington, Ont)
6	MF	CAN	Francesco Bruno (York - Toronto, Ont.)
7	MF	CAN	Olivier Babineau (Moncton - Dieppe, N.B.)
8	MF	CAN	Nick Poole (UBC - Mission, B.C.)
9	FW	CAN	Yannick Rome-Gosselin (Sherbrooke - St-Jean-sur-Richelieu, Que.)
10	FW	CAN	Cole McFarlane (Victoria - Calgary, Alta.)
11	FW	CAN	Matthew D'Angelo (Carleton - 5 - Ottawa, Ont.)

No.	Pos.	Nation	Player
12	GK	CAN	Srdjan Djekanovic (UBC - Vancouver, B.C.)
13	DF	CAN	Nicholas Persichino (Carleton - Thunder Bay, Ont.)
14	DF	CAN	Paul Hamilton (Trinity Western - Calgary, Alta.)
15	DF	CAN	Alex Lévesque-Tremblay (Laval - Baie-Saint-Paul, Que)
16	MF	FRA	Wandrille Lefevre (Montreal - Chartres, France)
17	MF	CAN	Ross Hagen (Dalhousie - Calgary, Alta.)
18	MF	CAN	James Scholefield (McGill - Senneville, Que.)
19	FW	CAN	Ken Morrison (UNB - Fredericton, N.B.)
20	FW	CAN	Paul Craig (UPEI - Charlottetown, P.E.I.)
21	FW	CAN	Brett Colvin (Alberta - Calgary, Alta.)
22	FW	CAN	Pat Mroczek (Western - St. Catharines, Ont.)

== Nationals ==
Consolation Final; 8-November-2008
Dalhousie Tigers	0
Carleton Ravens	3

Consolation Semi-final; 7-November-2008
Victoria Vikes	1
Dalhousie Tigers	2
Laurier Golden Hawks	1
Carleton Ravens	2

Quarter-finals; 6-November-2008
Victoria Vikes	0
York Lions	3
Dalhousie Tigers	0
Montreal Carabins	2
Laurier Golden Hawks	0
Trinity Western Spartans	1
Laval Rouge et Or	4
Carleton Ravens	1

Semi-finals; 8-November-2008
York Lions	1
Montreal Carabins	0
Trinity Western Spartans	2
Laval Rouge et Or	1

Final; 9-November-2008
York Lions	1
Trinity Western Spartans	0
Third place
Montreal Carabins	2
Laval Rouge et Or	1

=== Final ===
9-Nov-2008
15:00

York Lions	1-0	Trinity Western Spartans
David Nogaro 83'	CIS Report

Ravens' Field
Attendance: 600

York Lions
GK	1	Alim Karim
{{{home2pos}}}	2	Stefan Zlatanov
{{{home3pos}}}	3	{{{home3player}}}
{{{home4pos}}}	4	{{{home4player}}}
{{{home5pos}}}	5	{{{home5player}}}
{{{home6pos}}}	6	{{{home6player}}}
{{{home7pos}}}	7	{{{home7player}}}
{{{home8pos}}}	8	{{{home8player}}}
{{{home9pos}}}	9	{{{home9player}}}
{{{home10pos}}}	10	{{{home10player}}}
{{{home11pos}}}	11	{{{home11player}}}
Manager
(Canada) Carmine Isacco

Trinity Western Spartans
GK	1	Andrew Kowan
{{{away2pos}}}	2	{{{away2player}}}
{{{away3pos}}}	3	{{{away3player}}}
{{{away4pos}}}	4	{{{away4player}}}
{{{away5pos}}}	5	{{{away5player}}}
{{{away6pos}}}	6	{{{away6player}}}
{{{away7pos}}}	7	{{{away7player}}}
{{{away8pos}}}	8	{{{away8player}}}
{{{away9pos}}}	9	{{{away9player}}}
{{{away10pos}}}	10	{{{away10player}}}
{{{away11pos}}}	11	{{{away11player}}}
Manager
(Canada) Alan Alderson

=== Tournament XI ===
Note: Flags indicate national team as defined under FIFA eligibility rules; some limited exceptions apply. Players may hold more than one non-FIFA nationality.

No.	Pos.	Nation	Player
1	GK	CAN	Andrew Kowan ((Richmond, BC)Trinity Western)
2	DF	CAN	Paul Hamilton ((Calgary, AB)Trinity Western)
3	DF	MAR	Hicham Aâboubou ((Morocco)Montreal)
4	DF	CAN	Alexandre Lévesque-Tremblay ((Baie-Saint-Paul, QC), Laval)
5	MF	CAN	Gerard Ladiyou ((Burlington, Ont.), York)
6	MF	CAN	Francesco Bruno ((Toronto), York)
7	MF	CAN	Philip Rivers ((Toronto), York)
8	MF	CAN	Douglas Sereti ((Toronto), York)
9	MF	SUI	Nicolas Suter ((Switzerland), Montreal)
10	FW	CAN	Daniel Lowen ((Langley, B.C.), Trinity Western)
11	FW	CAN	Peter Mangiras ((Belleville, Ont.), Carleton)

== Regional Conference play-offs ==
=== Atlantic (AUS) ===
Top 6 will make the play-offs with 1 and 2 seeds getting a bye to the semi-final round. Hosted this season by Mount Allison. Other qualifiers include UNB, St. Mary's, Dalhousie, Moncton and UPEI.

Quarter-finals
4	Moncton Aigles Bleus	1
5	UPEI Panthers	3
3	Dalhousie Tigers	2
Host	Mount Allison Mounties	0

Semi-finals
1	UNB Varsity Reds	1 (AET)
5	UPEI Panters	0
2	SMU Huskies	1
3	Dalhousie Tigers	2

Finals
1	UNB Varsity Reds	0
3	Dalhousie Tigers	1

=== Quebec (QSSF) ===
Top 4 teams will make the semi-final round. McGill, Montreal and Laval have qualified.

Semi-final
Laval	3
McGill	1
Sherbrooke	1
Montreal	4

Final
Laval	0
Montreal	1

=== Ontario (OUA) ===
The OUA play-off will include the top 6 from each of the east and west divisions. The top 2 will get a bye to the quarter-finals with the 1st round being #6 @ #3 and #5 @ #4. In subsequent rounds, the teams will be repositioned so that the higher seed always plays the lowest. Laurier, York, Carleton and Toronto are the top 4 seeds.

Round 1 - West; 22-October-2008		Quarter-final; 25-October-2008
6	Queen's
3	Laurentian

Round 1 - West; 22-October-2008		Quarter-final; 25-October-2008
5	Ryerson
4	Trent

Round 1 - East; 22-October-2008		Quarter-final; 25-October-2008
5	Waterloo
4	Brock

Round 1 - East; 22-October-2008		Quarter-final; 25-October-2008
6	Guelph
3	Western

Semi-final
1E
2W
2E
1W

Final

=== Canada West (CW) ===
Top 4 teams make the semi-final round. The final four will be hosted by the top team. Currently UBC, Victoria and Trinity Western have clinched a spot.

Semi-final

Final

== Season Ranking ==
Top Ten rankings as published by the CIS.

Date	#1	#2	#3	#4	#5	#6	#7	#8	#9	#10
28 October 2008	Carleton	UBC	Montreal	York	Victoria	Toronto	McGill	UNB	Wilfrid Laurier	St. Mary's
21 October 2008	Carleton	UBC	Montreal	York	Victoria	Toronto	McGill	UNB	Wilfrid Laurier	St. Mary's
14 October 2008	Carleton	UBC	Victoria	Montreal	UNB	Toronto	Western Ontario	McGill	York	Dalhousie
7 October 2008	UBC	Carleton	Montreal	Victoria	UNB	Toronto	Western Ontario	McGill	York	Dalhousie
30 September 2008	York	UBC	Carleton	Victoria	Montreal	Toronto	UNB	Laval	Western Ontario	Dalhousie
23 September 2008	York	UBC	Laval	Carleton	Montreal	Victoria	Western Ontario	Toronto	UNB	UPEI
16 September 2008	York	Carleton	UBC	Laval	Montreal	Victoria	Toronto	Western Ontario	Cape Breton	UNB
9 September 2008	York	Laval	Trinity Western	Carleton	UBC	Saint Mary's	Toronto	Western Ontario	Montreal	Cape Breton
2 September 2008	UBC	Laval	Western Ontario	York	Trinity Western	Saint Mary's	Montreal	Cape Breton	Carleton	Victoria
