= 2024 U Sports Men's Soccer Championship =

Tournament details
- Country: Canada
- Venue(s): Vaso's Field; Oshawa, Ontario
- Dates: November 7–10, 2024
- Teams: 8

Final positions
- Champions: UBC Thunderbirds (14th title)
- Runners-up: Montreal Carabins
- Third place: York Lions

Tournament statistics
- Matches played: 11
- Goals scored: 32 (2.91 per match)
- Attendance: 5,508 (501 per match)
- Top goal scorer: Joven Mann (3 goals)

Awards
- Championship MVP: Joven Mann (UBC Thunderbirds)

The 2024 U Sports Men's Soccer Championship was the 52nd edition of the U Sports men's soccer championship, a postseason tournament to determine the national champion of the 2024 U Sports men's soccer season. The tournament started on November 7 and ended with the bronze-medal and championship games being played on November 10 at Ontario Tech University.

== Host ==
The tournament was held at Vaso's Field, on the grounds of Ontario Tech University. This was the first-ever U Sports national championship event hosted by Ontario Tech.

The matches were streamed live on CBC Gem, CBCSports.ca, CBC YouTube, and Radio-Canada. All matches were streamed on CBC Gem.

== Qualified teams ==
The championship consists of an eight-team single-elimination tournament. Four teams automatically qualify for the tournament as one of the winners of the four conferences, three qualify as the runners-ups, and one qualify as the host.

=== Participating teams ===
Team	Qualified	Last appearance	Last win
Ontario Tech Ridgebacks	OUA champions (Host)	None	Never
York Lions	OUA finalists	2023	2015
St. Francis Xavier X-Men	AUS champions	2023	Never
UNB Reds	AUS finalists	2018	1980
Montreal Carabins	RSEQ champions	2023	2021
McGill Redbirds	RSEQ finalists	2011	1997
UBC Thunderbirds	Canada West champions	2023	2013
Mount Royal Cougars	Canada West finalists	2023	Never

=== Seeding ===
The conference champions were allocated seeds 1 through 4, with the additional teams (conference runners-up or host team) allocated seeds 5 through 8. Ideally, seed 1 plays seed 8, seed 2 plays seed 7, seed 3 plays seed 6, and seed 4 plays seed 5, however, the bracket may be adjusted in the interest of avoiding an intra-conference matchup in the first round.

Pos	Conf.	Team	Reg. Season	Playoffs	Overall
1	CW	UBC Thunderbirds	11–1–3	3–0–0	14–1–3
2	RSEQ	Montreal Carabins	10–1–1	2–0–0	12–1–1
3	AUS	St. Francis Xavier X-Men	8–1–3	2–0–0	10–1–3
4	OUA	Ontario Tech Ridgebacks (H)	6–4–2	3–0–1	9–4–3
5	RSEQ	McGill Redbirds	5–4–3	1–1–0	6–5–3
6	OUA	York Lions	8–1–3	1–1–1	9–2–4
7	CW	Mount Royal Cougars	7–2–5	2–1–0	9–3–5
8	AUS	UNB Reds	4–4–4	2–1–0	6–5–4

Source: Seeding
(H) Host

== Bracket ==
5th place match
4	Ontario Tech Ridgebacks	1
3	St. Francis Xavier X-Men	2

Consolation semi-finals
8	UNB Reds	1
4	Ontario Tech Ridgebacks	2
7	Mount Royal Cougars	1
3	St. Francis Xavier X-Men	2

Quarter-finals
1	UBC Thunderbirds	4
8	UNB Reds	2
4	Ontario Tech Ridgebacks	1 (2)
5	McGill Redbirds (p)	1 (3)
2	Montreal Carabins	1
7	Mount Royal Cougars	0
3	St. Francis Xavier X-Men	1
6	York Lions	2

Semi-finals
1	UBC Thunderbirds	3
5	McGill Redbirds	0
2	Montreal Carabins	2
6	York Lions	1

Final
1	UBC Thunderbirds	1
2	Montreal Carabins	0
3rd place match
5	McGill Redbirds	1
6	York Lions	3

== Results ==
=== Day 1 ===
==== Quarter-finals ====
November 7, 2024
11:00am

St. Francis Xavier X-Men	1–2	York Lions
Logan Rieck 90+1'	Report	Yigal Bruk 6'; Christian Zeppieri 65' (pen.)

Vaso's Field, Oshawa, Ontario
Attendance: 1,024
Referee: Robert D'Alesio
November 7, 2024
1:30pm

Montreal Carabins	1–0	Mount Royal Cougars
Maxime Filion 51'	Report

Vaso's Field, Oshawa, Ontario
Attendance: 265
Referee: Melvin Christopher
November 7, 2024
4:00pm

UBC Thunderbirds	4–2	UNB Reds
Joven Mann 6', 41'; Henri Godbout 51', 57'	Report	Stefano D'Ambrogio 39'; Hunter Delahunt 80'

Vaso's Field, Oshawa, Ontario
Attendance: 434
Referee: Youcef Boumsied
November 7, 2024
7:00pm

Ontario Tech Ridgebacks	1–1 (a.e.t.)	McGill Redbirds
Kairo Coore 12'	Report	Yannick Laurent 36'
Penalties
Alexander Irwin (penalty scored); Kairo Coore (penalty scored); Alex Maadanian (penalty missed); Jack Sears (penalty missed); Jeremy Caprietta (penalty missed)	2–3	(penalty scored) Nassim Kemel; (penalty scored) Ibrahim Chami; (penalty scored) Maher Fares; (penalty missed) Stuart Klenner; (penalty missed) Kyle Azuma

Vaso's Field, Oshawa, Ontario
Attendance: 882
Referee: Niko Jecanski

=== Day 2 ===
==== Consolation Semi-finals ====
November 8, 2024
11:00am

St. Francis Xavier X-Men	2–1	Mount Royal Cougars
Cameron Shaw 35'; Isaac VanWychen 58'	Report	Joshua Flaksman 60'

Vaso's Field, Oshawa, Ontario
Attendance: 660
Referee: Melvin Christopher
November 8, 2024
1:30pm

Ontario Tech Ridgebacks	2–1	UNB Reds
Erion Metaj 65'; Kairo Coore 85'	Report	Ehab Moustafa 25'

Vaso's Field, Oshawa, Ontario
Attendance: 687
Referee: Robert D'Alesio

==== Semi-finals ====
November 8, 2024
4:00pm

Montreal Carabins	2–1	York Lions
Julien Bruce 45'; Quentin Paumier 51'	Report	Nick Spittle 24'

Vaso's Field, Oshawa, Ontario
Attendance: 0 (Note: Match report claims an attendance of 0, however, at least 200 spectators were clearly visible on the CBC broadcast.)
Referee: Youcef Boumsied
November 8, 2024
7:00pm

UBC Thunderbirds	3–0	McGill Redbirds
Luke Norman 3', 52'; Oliver Herbert 47'	Report

Vaso's Field, Oshawa, Ontario
Attendance: 212
Referee: Fabrizio Stasolla

=== Day 3 ===
==== 5th place match ====
November 9, 2024
5:00pm

Ontario Tech Ridgebacks	1–2	St. Francis Xavier X-Men
Erion Metaj 68'	Report	Charlie Waters 3'; Kyle Cordeiro 53'

Vaso's Field, Oshawa, Ontario
Attendance: 598
Referee: Robert D'Alesio

=== Day 4 ===
==== 3rd place match ====
November 10, 2024
11:00am

McGill Redbirds	1–3	York Lions
Nathan Yee 7'	Report	Yigal Bruk 29'; Gianluca Condello 36'; Christian Zeppieri 58'

Vaso's Field, Oshawa, Ontario
Attendance: 268
Referee: Melvin Christopher

==== Final ====
November 10, 2024
2:00pm

UBC Thunderbirds	1–0	Montreal Carabins
Joven Mann 90+2'	Report

Vaso's Field, Oshawa, Ontario
Attendance: 478
Referee: Niko Jecanski

== Statistics ==
=== Goalscorers ===
There have been 32 goals scored in 11 matches, for an average of 2.91 goals per match.

3 goals

- Joven Mann – UBC

2 goals

- Yigal Bruk – York
- Kairo Coore – Ontario Tech
- Henri Godbout – UBC
- Erion Metaj – Ontario Tech
- Luke Norman – UBC
- Christian Zeppieri – York

1 goal

- Julien Bruce – Montreal
- Gianluca Condello – York
- Kyle Cordeiro – St. Francis Xavier
- Stefano D'Ambrogio – UNB
- Hunter Delahunt – UNB
- Maxime Filion – Montreal
- Joshua Flaksman – Mount Royal
- Oliver Herbert – UBC
- Yannick Laurent – McGill
- Ehab Moustafa – UNB
- Quentin Paumier – Montreal
- Logan Rieck – St. Francis Xavier
- Cameron Shaw – St. Francis Xavier
- Nick Spittle – York
- Isaac VanWychen – St. Francis Xavier
- Charlie Waters – St. Francis Xavier
- Nathan Yee – McGill

== See also ==
- 2024 CPL–U Sports Draft
- 2025 CPL–U Sports Draft
