= U Sports men's soccer championship =

Canadian university soccer tournament

- Most recent season or competition: 2026 U Sports Men's Soccer Championship
- Sport: Association football
- Founded: 1972; 54 years ago
- First season: 1972
- Organizing body: U Sports
- No. of teams: 8
- Country: Canada
- Most recent champion: Victoria (6th title) (2026)
- Most titles: UBC (14 titles)
- Streaming partners: CBC Sports; CBC Gem
- Related competitions: U Sports women's soccer championship
- Website: usports.ca/championship

The U Sports Men's Soccer Championship is a Canadian university soccer tournament conducted by U Sports to determine the men's national champion. The tournament involves the champions from each of Canada's four regional sports conferences. The Sam Davidson Memorial Trophy is awarded to the winners.

Victoria is the reigning champion and won for the sixth time in 2026 to become tied with York for the second-most championships. Both programs sit behind UBC, who have 14 national championships.

== Format ==
The championship features eight teams in single-elimination matches to determine a national champion. The championship hosts 11 games over four days at a predetermined host venue. The host team is automatically qualified for the tournament, as is each of the conference champions, with additional berths awarded for the remaining spots.

== Results ==
Key

- (1) – Title number
- a.e.t. – Match went to extra time
- p – Match decided by a penalty shootout after extra time

Ed.	Season	Winner	Score	Runner-up	Venue / city	Ref.
1	1972	Alberta (1)	3–1	Loyola	York University	
2	1973	Loyola (1)	1–1 (4–3 p)	Alberta Golden Bears	Memorial University	
3	1974	UBC (1)	2–1	Loyola	Concordia University	
4	1975	Victoria (1)	2–1	Concordia	University of Victoria	
5	1976	Concordia (1)	2–1 (a.e.t.)	Dalhousie	Concordia University	
6	1977	York (1)	2–1	Concordia Stingers	Waterloo	
7	1978	Manitoba (1)	2–1	Victoria	University of Victoria	
8	1979	Alberta (2)	2–0	Saint Mary's	University of Alberta	
9	1980	UNB (1)	3–1	Wilfrid Laurier	University of New Brunswick	
10	1981	McGill (1)	0–0 (4–2 p)	Alberta	University of Alberta	
11	1982	McGill (2)	1–0	Victoria	McGill University	
12	1983	Laurentian (1)	2–1 (a.e.t.)	McGill	Laurentian University	
13	1984	UBC (2)	2–1 (a.e.t.)	Carleton	Carleton University	
14	1985	UBC (3)	2–1	Concordia	University of British Columbia	
15	1986	UBC (4)	4–0	Toronto	University of Toronto	
16	1987	Victoria (2)	3–1	Laurier	McGill University	
17	1988	Toronto (1)	1–0	McGill	University of British Columbia	
18	1989	UBC (5)	1–0	Saint Mary's	University of British Columbia	
19	1990	UBC (6)	2–1	Guelph	University of Guelph	
20	1991	UBC (7)	3–1	McMaster	Queen's University	
21	1992	UBC (8)	3–2	McMaster	University of Guelph	
22	1993	Sherbrooke (1)	2–1	UBC	Acadia University	
23	1994	UBC (9)	5–0	Alberta	University of British Columbia	
24	1995	Dalhousie (1)	3–1	Alberta	University of Québec	
25	1996	Victoria (3)	1–0	Western	York University	
26	1997	McGill (3)	0–0 (5–4 p)	UBC	Dalhousie University	
27	1998	Western (1)	2–0	Alberta	McGill University	
28	1999	Western (2)	1–0	Alberta	University of Victoria	
29	2000	Laurier (1)	2–1 (p)	Saint Mary's	McMaster University	
30	2001	Laurier (2)	2–1	UBC	Saint Mary's University	
31	2002	Brock (1)	1–0 (a.e.t.)	Carleton	Keith Harris Stadium, Carleton	
32	2003	Alberta (3)	2–1 (a.e.t.)	Saint Mary's	McGill Stadium, Montreal	
33	2004	Victoria (4)	3–1	McGill	CEPSUM Stadium, Montréal	
34	2005	UBC (10)	2–1	Toronto	University of Prince Edward Island	
35	2006	Alberta (4)	2–1	Trinity	Foote Field, Alberta	
36	2007	UBC (11)	2–1	Laval	Wolfson Field, British Columbia	
37	2008	York (2)	1–0	Trinity	Carleton	
38	2009	Laval (1)	3–2	McGill	Trinity Western University	
39	2010	York (3)	1–0	UBC	Varsity Centre, Toronto	
40	2011	Victoria (5)	3–1	Saint Mary's	Centennial Stadium, Victoria	
41	2012	UBC (12)	1–0	Cape Breton	PEPS Sports Complex, Laval	
42	2013	UBC (13)	3–1	Laval	BMO Centre, New Brunswick	
43	2014	York (4)	1–0	McMaster	UPEI Turf field, PEI	
44	2015	York (5)	2–0	UNB	York Stadium, York	
45	2016	Alberta (5)	1–0	UQAM	Alumni Stadium, Guelph	
46	2017	Cape Breton (1)	3–2	Montreal	Hillside Stadium, Thompson Rivers	
47	2018	Montreal (1)	2–1	Cape Breton	Thunderbird Stadium, British Columbia	
48	2019	UQTR (1)	2–0	Montreal	CEPSUM Stadium, Montréal	
–	2020	(Cancelled due to the COVID-19 pandemic) – Awarded host: Carleton				
49	2021	Montreal (2)	2–2 (5–4 p)	Carleton	MNP Park, Carleton	
50	2022	TRU (1)	2–1 (a.e.t.)	UBC	Hillside Stadium, Thompson Rivers	
51	2023	Cape Breton (2)	1–0	Montreal	Health Recreation Complex, Cape Breton	
52	2024	UBC (14)	1–0	Montreal	Vaso’s Field, Ontario Tech	
53	2025	York (6)	1–0 (a.e.t.)	Mount Royal	Varsity Stadium, Toronto	
54	2026	Victoria (6)	1–0 (a.e.t.)	Montreal	Centennial Stadium, Victoria	
55	2027				Foote Field, Alberta	

== See also ==
- NCAA Division I men's soccer tournament
- U Sports women's soccer championship
- College soccer
