= U Sports men's soccer =

Canadian amateur soccer tournament

- Formerly: CIAU Soccer, CIS Soccer
- Sport: Soccer
- Founded: 1972; 54 years ago
- No. of teams: 48, in four conferences (2024)
- Country: Canada
- Most recent champion: York Lions (6th title) (2025)
- Most titles: UBC Thunderbirds (14)
- Related competitions: U Sports men's soccer championship
- Website: usports.ca/msoc

U Sports men's soccer is the highest level of amateur play of association football in Canada and operates under the auspices of U Sports, Canada's governing body for university sports. As of the 2024 season, 48 teams from Canadian universities are divided into four athletic conferences, drawing from the four regional associations of U Sports: Canada West Universities Athletic Association, Ontario University Athletics, Réseau du sport étudiant du Québec, and Atlantic University Sport. After interconference playoffs have been played, eight teams compete for the Sam Davidson Memorial Trophy, awarded to the U Sports men's soccer championship team.

== Season structure ==
=== Regular season ===
The regular season is eight to nine weeks long, depending on the conference. Teams play between 12 and 16 regular season games, depending on conference or division, with teams typically playing a home and home series with every other team in their conference or division. All regular season games are in-conference. Following the conclusion of the regular season, the Joe Johnson Memorial Trophy is awarded annually to the Player of the Year in U Sports men's soccer.

=== Playoffs ===
After the regular season, single elimination playoff games are held between the top teams in each conference to determine conference champions. In the Canada West and RSEQ conferences, the top four teams qualify for the playoffs, with the fourth and first seeded teams playing one match and the third and second seeded teams playing another. The two winning teams then play for the conference championship. Because there are more teams in the Atlantic conference, the top six teams qualify, with the top two teams receiving a first-round bye. The sixth and third seeded teams play one match and the fifth and fourth seeded teams play another. The winning teams then go on to play the top two seeded teams, with the lowest remaining seed playing the first seeded team and the highest remaining seed playing the second seeded team. The winners of these two semi-final matches then play for the Atlantic conference championship.

The Ontario playoff system operates much like the Atlantic one, except it functions for both the West and East divisions. The top six teams from each division (twelve total) qualify for the playoffs, with the top two seeds of each division receiving byes. The champions of each division then play for the OUA conference championship. Because the OUA has 12 teams competing, it necessitates a longer post-season schedule. Consequently, the first round of the playoffs in the OUA occurs during the same week that each of the other three conferences are playing their last regular season games. The four conference champions automatically qualify for the U Sports men's soccer championship.

=== Men's Soccer Championship ===
The U Sports men's soccer championship, first established in 1972, features eight teams in single elimination matches to determine a national champion. The championship hosts 11 games over four days at a predetermined host venue. The host team is automatically qualified for the tournament, as is each of the conference champions. The top team from the host conference (besides the host team) also qualifies. Berths are also awarded to the second-place finisher in each of the other three conferences.

== Teams ==
=== Atlantic University Sport ===
University	Varsity Name	City	Province	Founded	Soccer Stadium	Stadium Capacity
Acadia University	Axemen	Wolfville	NS	1838	Raymond Field	3,000
Cape Breton University	Capers	Sydney	NS	2005	CBU Field	N/A
Dalhousie University	Tigers	Halifax	NS	1818	Wickwire Field	2,000
Memorial University of Newfoundland	Sea-Hawks	St. John's	NL	1925	King George V Park	6,400
Université de Moncton	Aigles Bleu	Moncton	NB	1864	Moncton Stadium	10,000
Mount Allison University	Mounties	Sackville	NB	1839	MacAulay Field	2,500
University of New Brunswick	Varsity Reds	Fredericton	NB	1785	BMO Centre	2,500
University of Prince Edward Island	Panthers	Charlottetown	PEI	1969	UPEI Alumni Canada Games Place	1,670
Saint Mary's University	Huskies	Halifax	NS	1802	Huskies Stadium	4,000
St. Francis Xavier University	X-Men	Antigonish	NS	1853	Oland Stadium	4,000

=== Canada West Universities Athletic Association ===
University	Varsity Name	City	Province	Founded	Soccer Stadium	Stadium Capacity
**Pacific Division**
University of British Columbia	Thunderbirds	Vancouver	BC	1906	Thunderbird Stadium	3,500
University of British Columbia Okanagan	Heat	Kelowna	BC	2005	Nonis Sports Field	200
University of the Fraser Valley	Cascades	Abbotsford	BC	1974	Bateman Park	1,000
University of Northern British Columbia	Timberwolves	Prince George	BC	1990	Charles Jago Sport Centre	N/A
Thompson Rivers University	WolfPack	Kamloops	BC	1970	Hillside Stadium	1,060
Trinity Western University	Spartans	Langley	BC	1962	Rogers Park	N/A
University of Victoria	Vikes	Victoria	BC	1903	Centennial Stadium	5,000
**Prairie Division**
University of Alberta	Golden Bears	Edmonton	AB	1908	Foote Soccer Field	1,500
University of Calgary	Dinos	Calgary	AB	1966	West Varsity Soccer Pitch	N/A
University of Lethbridge	Pronghorns	Lethbridge	AB	1967	U of L Community Stadium	2,000
MacEwan University	Griffins	Edmonton	AB	1938	Edmonton Soccer Dome	1,000
Mount Royal University	Cougars	Calgary	AB	1910	MRU Stadium Field	N/A
University of Saskatchewan	Huskies	Saskatoon	SK	1907	Field 7 in PotashCorp Park	400

=== Ontario University Athletics ===
University	Varsity Name	City	Province	Founded	Soccer Stadium	Stadium Capacity
**East Division**
Carleton University	Ravens	Ottawa	ON	1952	Ravens' Field	3,000
Laurentian University	Voyageurs	Sudbury	ON	1960	Laurentian Soccer Field	N/A
Nipissing University	Lakers	North Bay	ON	1909	Nipissing University soccer pitch	200
Ontario Tech University	Ridgebacks	Oshawa	ON	2002	Vaso's Field	N/A
Queen's University	Gaels	Kingston	ON	1841	Richardson Memorial Stadium	10,258
Royal Military College of Canada	Paladins	Kingston	ON	1876	Inner Field	N/A
Toronto Metropolitan University (formerly Ryerson)	Bold	Toronto	ON	1948	Monarch Park Stadium	5,000
University of Toronto	Varsity Blues	Toronto	ON	1827	Varsity Stadium	5,000
Trent University	Excalibur	Peterborough	ON	1962	Justin Chiu Stadium	1,000
**West Division**
Algoma University	Thunderbirds	Sault Ste. Marie	ON	1964	Superior Heights Field	1,000
Brock University	Badgers	St. Catharines	ON	1964	Brock Field	1,200
University of Guelph	Gryphons	Guelph	ON	1964	Alumni Stadium	4,100
McMaster University	Marauders	Hamilton	ON	1887	Ron Joyce Stadium	6,000
University of Waterloo	Warriors	Waterloo	ON	1959	Warrior Field	5,400
Western University	Mustangs	London	ON	1878	TD Waterhouse Stadium	8,000
Wilfrid Laurier University	Golden Hawks	Waterloo	ON	1911	Alumni Field	N/A
University of Windsor	Lancers	Windsor	ON	1857	University of Windsor Stadium	2000
York University	Lions	Toronto	ON	1959	York Stadium	2,500

=== Réseau du sport étudiant du Québec ===
University	Varsity Name	City	Province	Founded	Soccer Stadium	Stadium Capacity
Concordia University	Stingers	Montreal	QC	1896	Concordia Stadium	4,000
Université Laval	Rouge et Or	Quebec City	QC	1663	PEPS Stadium	12,257
McGill University	Redbirds	Montreal	QC	1821	Percival Molson Memorial Stadium	25,012
Université de Montréal	Carabins	Montreal	QC	1821	CEPSUM Stadium	5,100
Université de Sherbrooke	Vert et Or	Sherbrooke	QC	1843	Stade de l'Université de Sherbrooke	3,359
Université du Québec à Montréal	Citadins	Montreal	QC	1969	terrain #2 of Complexe sportif Claude-Robillard	1,000
Université du Québec à Trois-Rivières	Patriotes	Trois-Rivières	QC	1969	Stade de l'UQTR	1,500

== Professional advancement ==
U Sports was previously not geared towards producing professional soccer players, though some U Sports players have turned pro. Top players in high schools and sports academies may opt not to play in U Sports so that they can turn pro directly. U Sports players are not eligible for the MLS SuperDraft. Despite this, some U Sports alumni in the pro ranks include Haidar Al-Shaibani (Western), Nana Attakora (York), Gabe Gala (Toronto), and Srdjan Djekanović (UBC).

Since 2019, U Sports men's soccer players have been eligible for the CPL–U Sports Draft, a draft conducted by the Canadian Premier League. This has allowed U Sports players to have a direct route to a professional league after post-secondary school. The creation of the draft has given a pathway to dozens of players since its inception. Not only do professional clubs now focus on drafting these players, but players can be invited to training camps during the university offseason allowing for greater development. Players not drafted or signed can return to school, if eligibility remains.
