= Centennial Stadium (disambiguation) =

Centennial Stadium is a sports stadium at the University of Victoria in Victoria, British Columbia, Canada.

Centennial Stadium may also refer to:

- Centennial Park Stadium, Toronto, Ontario, Canada
- Centennial Olympic Stadium, former stadium in Atlanta, Georgia, United States
- Centennial Stadium, temporary Denver Summit FC home stadium, Centennial, Colorado, United States
