= Zeppieri =

Zeppieri is a surname. Notable people with the surname include:

- Christian Zeppieri (born 2003), Canadian soccer player
- Giulio Zeppieri (born 2001), Italian tennis player
