= 2007 CIS Men's Soccer Championship =

The 2007 CIS Men's Soccer Championship was held from 8 to 11 November 2008 at the University of British Columbia in Vancouver, British Columbia.

The UBC Thunderbirds defeated the Laval Rouge et Or 2–1.

== All-Canadians ==
First Team(1–11) and Second Team(12–22) with school and hometown.

Note: Flags indicate national team as defined under FIFA eligibility rules; some limited exceptions apply. Players may hold more than one non-FIFA nationality.

No.	Pos.	Nation	Player
1	GK	CAN	Haidar Al-Shaibani (Western Ontario - London, ON)
2	DF	CAN	Roberto Gutierrez (Carleton - Ottawa, ON)
3	DF	CAN	Alexandre Lévesque-Tremblay (Laval - Quebec City, QC)
4	MF	CAN	Ricardo Marquez (Cape Breton - Hamilton, ON)
5	MF	CAN	Francesco Bruno (York - Toronto, ON - R)
6	MF	CAN	Nick Perugini (Trinity Western - Montreal, QC - MVP)
7	FW	CAN	Ken Morrison (UNB - Fredericton, NB)
8	FW	POL	Mike Bialy (Toronto - Mississauga, ON)
9	FW	BFA	Boris Idriss Gervais Salou (Laval - Ouagadougou, Burkina Faso)
10	FW	CAN	Kwame Osei (Cape Breton - Toronto, ON)
11	FW	CAN	Spencer Schmidt (Fraser Valley - Abbotsford, BC)

No.	Pos.	Nation	Player
12	GK	CAN	Gérardo Argento (Montreal - Montreal, QC)
13	DF	CAN	Paul Hamilton (Trinity Western - Calgary, AB)
14	DF	CAN	Graham Smith (UBC - Abbotsford, BC)
15	DF	CZE	Miroslav Novak (StFX - Prague, Czech Republic - R)
16	MF	CAN	Nick Milonas (Queen's - Kingston, ON)
17	MF	FRA	Johan Le Goff (Montreal - Paris, France)
18	DF	CAN	Istvan Lakner (Saint Mary's - Dartmouth, NS)
19	MF	CAN	Scott MacLennan (Brock - Burlington, ON)
20	FW	CAN	Mark Bennett (Brock - Brantford, ON)
21	FW	CAN	Kofi Ilboudo (Carleton - Ottawa, ON)
22	FW	CAN	Moreno Alberti (York - Winnipeg, Minnesota - Rookie of the Year)

== Final ==
11-November-2007
13:30 (UTC-8)

UBC	2-1	Laval
Graham Smith 23'; Steve Frazao 82'		Gabriel Moreau 46'

Thunderbird Stadium

== Bracket ==
Quarter-finals; 8-November-2007
Trinity Western	0
Western Ontario	1
Cape Breton	0
Laval	3
York	2
St. Mary's	1
UBC	2
Montreal	0

Semi-finals; 10-November-2007
Western	1
Laval	2
York	1
UBC	2

Final; 11-November-2007
Laval	1
UBC	2
Third place
Western	4
York	1

Consolation Semi-final; 9-November-2008
St. Mary's	1
Montreal	0
Trinity Western	1
Cape Breton	0

Consolation Final; 10-November-2008
St. Mary's	0
Trinity Western	1

== All-Canadians ==
First team (school and home town listed also) Note: Flags indicate national team as defined under FIFA eligibility rules; some limited exceptions apply. Players may hold more than one non-FIFA nationality.

No.	Pos.	Nation	Player
1	GK	CAN	Haidar Al-Shaibani (Western Ontario - London, ON)
2	DF	CAN	Roberto Gutierrez (Carleton - Ottawa, ON)
3	DF	CAN	Alexandre Lévesque-Tremblay (Laval - Quebec City, QC)
4	MF	CAN	Ricardo Marquez (Cape Breton - Hamilton, ON)
5	MF	CAN	Francesco Bruno (York - Toronto, ON - R)

No.	Pos.	Nation	Player
6	MF	CAN	Nick Perugini (Trinity Western - Montreal, QC - MVP)
7	FW	CAN	Ken Morrison (UNB - Fredericton, NB)
8	FW	POL	Mike Bialy (Toronto - Mississauga, ON)
9	FW	BFA	Boris Idriss Gervais Salou (Laval - Ouagadougou, Burkina Faso)
10	FW	CAN	Kwame Osei (Cape Breton - Toronto, ON)
11	FW	CAN	Spencer Schmidt (Fraser Valley - Abbotsford, BC)

Second team (school and home town listed also) Note: Flags indicate national team as defined under FIFA eligibility rules; some limited exceptions apply. Players may hold more than one non-FIFA nationality.

No.	Pos.	Nation	Player
1	GK	CAN	Gérardo Argento (Montreal - Montreal, QC)
2	DF	CAN	Paul Hamilton (Trinity Western - Calgary, AB)
3	DF	CAN	Graham Smith (UBC - Abbotsford, BC)
4	DF	CZE	Miroslav Novak (StFX - Prague, Czech Republic - R)
5	MF	CAN	Nick Milonas (Queen's - Kingston, ON)

No.	Pos.	Nation	Player
6	MF	FRA	Johan Le Goff (Montreal - Paris, France)
7	DF	CAN	Istvan Lakner (Saint Mary's - Dartmouth, NS)
8	MF	CAN	Scott MacLennan (Brock - Burlington, ON)
9	FW	CAN	Mark Bennett (Brock - Brantford, ON)
10	FW	CAN	Kofi Ilboudo (Carleton - Ottawa, ON)
11	FW	CAN	Moreno Alberti (York - Winnipeg, Minnesota - Rookie of the Year)

Bialy, the CIS player of the year in 2006, and Marquez are both selected for the second straight season.
