= Jason Hartill =

Canadian soccer player (born 2004)

Personal information
- Date of birth: January 16, 2004 (age 22)
- Place of birth: Carleton Place, Ontario Canada
- Position: Midfielder

Team information
- Current team: Atlético Ottawa

Youth career
- West Ottawa SC
- Toronto FC

College career
Years	Team	Apps	(Gls)
2023–	CBU Capers	15	(0)

Senior career*
Years	Team	Apps	(Gls)
2024	York United FC	2	(0)
2025	Atlético Ottawa	1	(0)
2026–	West Ottawa SC	1	(1)
- * Club domestic league appearances and goals as of April 20, 2026

Jason Hartill (born January 16, 2004) is a Canadian soccer player who plays for West Ottawa SC in LS Pro Ligue3.

== Early life ==
After playing houseleague soccer in his hometown in Carleton Place for four years, he then joined West Ottawa SC at U9 level. He then joined the Toronto FC Academy when he was at the U17 level. He also played with Team Ontario at the U16 and U18 levels, including at the 2022 Canada Summer Games.

== University career ==
In 2023, he began attending Cape Breton University, where he played for the men's soccer team. In his first season, he won the U Sports national title with the Capers, while also being named an AUS Second Team All-Star.

== Club career ==
At the 2024 CPL-U Sports Draft, Hartill was selected in the second round (12th overall) by York United FC. In May 2024, he signed a U-Sports contract with the club, allowing him to maintain his university eligibility. On May 4, he made his Canadian Premier League debut, in a substitute appearance, against Pacific FC. In August 2024, he departed the club to return to university, with the club declining to retain his rights for the 2025 season.

At the 2025 CPL–U Sports Draft, Antoniuk was selected in the first round (6th overall) by Atlético Ottawa. In April 2025, he signed a U Sports contract with the club. In August 2025, he extended his U Sports contract for the remainder of the season, rather than to return to university.
