= Joven Mann =

Canadian soccer player

Personal information
- Date of birth: September 28, 2004 (age 22)
- Place of birth: Surrey, British Columbia, Canada
- Height: 6 ft 1 in (1.85 m)
- Position: Midfielder

Team information
- Current team: HFX Wanderers FC

Youth career
- Surrey United SC
- 2021–2023: Vancouver Whitecaps FC

College career
Years	Team	Apps	(Gls)
2024–	UBC Thunderbirds	21	(6)

Senior career*
Years	Team	Apps	(Gls)
2022–2023	Whitecaps FC Academy	21	(3)
2022–2023	→ Whitecaps FC 2	0	(0)
2024	Burnaby FC	9	(1)
2025	HFX Wanderers FC	0	(0)
2026–	Burnaby FC	3	(0)
- * Club domestic league appearances and goals as of October 3, 2026

Joven Mann (born September 28, 2004) is a Canadian soccer player who plays for Burnaby FC in the British Columbia Premier League.

== Early life ==
Mann played youth soccer with Surrey United SC, before joining the Vancouver Whitecaps FC Academy in 2021.

== University career ==
In 2024, Mann began attending the University of British Columbia, where he played for the men's soccer team. On September 14, 2024, he scored his first goal in a victory over the Alberta Golden Bears. He helped UBC win the 2024 U Sports Men's Soccer Championship, being named Tournament MVP and named to the All-Tournament team, also earning Canada West Player of the Week honours. In addition, he was named to the Canada West All-Rookie Team.

== Club career ==
In 2022, Mann began playing with the Whitecaps FC Academy in League1 British Columbia. He also was called up to the Whitecaps FC 2 team in MLS Next Pro for some matches, but did not make any appearances.

In 2024, he played with Burnaby FC in League1 British Columbia.

At the 2025 CPL-U Sports Draft, Mann was selected in the second round (11th overall) by HFX Wanderers FC. In March 2025, he signed a U Sports contract with the club, allowing him to maintain his university eligibility. He made his debut for the club on May 7 in a 2025 Canadian Championship match against Forge FC. In August 2025, he departed the club to return to university, as per the terms of his U Sports contract, with the club retaining his rights for the 2026 season.

== Career statistics ==
As of October 3, 2026

Club	Season	League			Playoffs		Domestic Cup		League Cup		Total	
Club	Season	Division	Apps	Goals	Apps	Goals	Apps	Goals	Apps	Goals	Apps	Goals
Whitecaps FC Academy	2022	League1 British Columbia	9	2	–		–		–		9	2
Whitecaps FC Academy	2023	League1 British Columbia	12	1	2	1	–		–		14	2
Whitecaps FC Academy	Total		21	3	2	1	0	0	0	0	23	4
Whitecaps FC 2	2022	MLS Next Pro	0	0	–		–		–		0	0
Whitecaps FC 2	2023	MLS Next Pro	0	0	–		–		–		0	0
Whitecaps FC 2	Total		0	0	0	0	0	0	0	0	0	0
Burnaby FC	2024	League1 British Columbia	9	1	–		–		–		9	1
HFX Wanderers FC	2025	Canadian Premier League	0	0	–		1	0	–		1	0
Burnaby FC	2026	League1 British Columbia	3	0	–		–		–		3	0
Career total			33	4	2	1	1	0	0	0	36	5
