= Sandra Couture =

Canadian soccer player

Personal information
- Full name: Sandra Couture
- Date of birth: March 15, 1983 (age 43)
- Place of birth: Saint-Georges, Quebec, Canada
- Height: 1.65 m (5 ft 5 in)
- Position: Striker

College career
| Years | Team | Apps | (Gls) |
| 2002–2006 | Montreal Carabins | | |

Senior career*
| Years | Team | Apps | (Gls) |
| 2006–2007 | Laval Comets | 9 | (6) |
| 2009–2010 | Juvisy B | 12 | (8) |
| 2010–2011 | Juvisy | 3 | (0) |
- * Club domestic league appearances and goals as of 11 May 2015

Sandra Couture (born March 15, 1983, in Saint-Georges, Quebec) is a Canadian soccer player who last played for French club Juvisy of the Division 1 Féminine. She plays as a striker and joined her current club ahead of the 2009–10 season after a successful career at the Université de Montréal with the Montreal Carabins. From 2002 to 2006, Couture scored a team-record 52 goals, was named the Player of the Year once, and was named to the All-Canadian First Team on two occasions. Prior to joining Juvisy in 2009, she worked as an assistant coach at the university after previous injuries delayed her opportunities to start her club career in France. Though, Couture hasn't represented Canada on international level, she has represented her nation at the 2005 and 2007 editions of the Summer Universiade.
