= Vincent Lamy =

Canadian soccer player (born 1999)

Personal information
- Full name: Vincent Lamy
- Date of birth: July 10, 1999 (age 27)
- Place of birth: Sherbrooke, Quebec, Canada
- Height: 1.72 m (5 ft 8 in)
- Position: Forward

Youth career
- 2005–2013: Dynamik Sherbrooke
- 2014–2015: Étoiles de L'Est
- 2015: Alessandria
- 2016–2018: Montreal Impact

College career
Years	Team	Apps	(Gls)
- UQTR Patriotes

Senior career*
Years	Team	Apps	(Gls)
2019	HFX Wanderers	4	(0)
2020–2021	Celtix du Haut-Richelieu	18	(3)
2024	Celtix du Haut-Richelieu	3	(0)
2025–	CS Trois-Rivières	4	(1)
- * Club domestic league appearances and goals as of September 23, 2025

Vincent Lamy (born July 10, 1999) is a Canadian soccer player who plays as a forward for CS Trois-Rivières in Ligue2 Quebec.

== Early life ==
Lamy was born in Sherbrooke, Quebec. Lamy began playing soccer in 2005 with hometown club Dynamik Sherbrooke, where he played until 2013. In 2014, he began playing for Laval-based club Les Étoiles de L'Est.

In 2015, Lamy signed a youth contract with Italian side Alessandria. However, due to a rule change by FIFA regarding minors playing abroad, the 16 year-old Lamy was prohibited from playing official matches for the club, but was still able to appear in friendlies while training with the academy. He spent four months with Alessandria but was eventually forced to return to Canada. After returning to Canada, Lamy joined the Montreal Impact Academy in 2016. Lamy played two seasons of USSDA soccer with the Montreal Impact U18s and U19s, scoring six goals in seventeen appearances in his first year and 22 goals in 25 appearances in his second.

== University career ==
Lamy attended the Université du Québec à Trois-Rivières, where he played for the men's soccer team. He was named an RSEQ Second Team All-Star in 2022 and 2023.

== Club career ==
On January 22, 2019, Lamy signed his first professional contract with Canadian Premier League side HFX Wanderers. He made his debut on May 16 in a Canadian Championship match against the Vaughan Azzurri. On April 28, 2019 he made his league debut for Halifax as a substitute in a 1–0 loss to Pacific FC. On 14 December 2019, the club announced that Lamy would not be returning for the 2020 season.

In 2020, Lamy played in the Première Ligue de soccer du Québec with debutants Celtix du Haut-Richelieu during a season shortened by the COVID-19 pandemic, scoring one goal in four appearances.

== International career ==
In 2014, Lamy participated in three Canadian under-15 identification camps, including a training camp in Costa Rica.

== Career statistics ==
As of September 23, 2025

Club statistics
Club	Season	League			Playoffs		Domestic Cup		League Cup		Total	
Club	Season	Division	Apps	Goals	Apps	Goals	Apps	Goals	Apps	Goals	Apps	Goals
HFX Wanderers FC	2019	Canadian Premier League	4	0	—		3	0	—		7	0
Celtix du Haut-Richelieu	2020	PLSQ	4	1	—		—		—		4	1
Celtix du Haut-Richelieu	2021	PLSQ	14	2	—		—		—		6	1
Celtix du Haut-Richelieu	2024	Ligue1 Québec	3	0	—		—		0	0	3	0
Celtix du Haut-Richelieu	Total		21	3	0	0	0	0	0	0	21	3
CS Trois-Rivières	2025	Ligue2 Québec	4	1	—		—		—		4	1
Career total			29	4	0	0	3	0	0	0	32	4
