= 2024 CPL–U Sports Draft =

Sixth annual Canadian Premier League sports draft

General information
- Sport: Soccer
- Date: December 14, 2023
- Time: 1:00 PM ET
- Network: YouTube

Overview
- 16 total selections in 2 rounds
- League: Canadian Premier League
- Teams: 8
- First selection: Owen Sheppard, Valour FC

The 2024 CPL–U Sports Draft was the sixth annual CPL–U Sports Draft. Canadian Premier League (CPL) teams selected 16 eligible U Sports soccer players to be invited to their respective preseason camps with the opportunity to earn development contracts for the 2024 Canadian Premier League season.

== Format ==
Players could be selected if they had one to four years of U Sports eligibility remaining, were in good academic standing, were planning to return to school the following year, and completed the CPL's draft declaration form by December 5, 2023. On December 6, the CPL released the list of 203 athletes who declared for the draft. Players who were selected can sign a full professional contract or a U Sports development contract, which allows them to return to university for the following season, without losing their eligibility.

Teams were able to retain the rights to previously drafted players who had signed U Sports contracts. In total, seven players were retained by their CPL clubs.

Each CPL team made two selections in the draft with selections made in the reverse order of the previous season's standings, including playoffs and final standings. Teams may trade selections; on draft day, Vancouver FC traded the 10th overall selection to Cavalry FC in exchange for the 15th overall selection and future considerations. These future considerations eventually became Canadian winger Ben Fisk who transferred from Cavalry to Vancouver on January 9, 2024.

== Player selection ==
*	Denotes player who has signed a professional contract for the 2024 season
^	Denotes player who has signed a developmental contract for the 2024 season

The following players were selected:

=== Round 1 ===
Pick #	CPL team	Player	Position	Nationality	University	Last team/academy
1	Valour FC	Owen Sheppard	FW	Canada	Cape Breton	
2	Vancouver FC	Luke Norman	MF	Canada	British Columbia	Whitecaps FC Academy (L1BC)
3	Atlético Ottawa	Luca Piccioli^{^}	MF	Canada	Carleton	Montreal Impact Academy (U19)
4	York United FC	Christian Zeppieri^{^}	MF	Canada	York	Vaughan Azzurri (L1O)
5	HFX Wanderers FC	Daniel Clarke^{^}	GK	England (Note: Also holds Canadian citizenship)	Cape Breton	Woodbridge Strikers (L1O)
6	Pacific FC	Michael Maslanka	FW	Canada	Toronto	
7	Cavalry FC	Caden Rogozinski^{^}	DF	Canada	Mount Royal	Calgary Foothills FC (L1AB)
8	Forge FC	Mouhamed Ndiaye	MF	Canada	UQTR	

=== Round 2 ===
Pick #	CPL team	Player	Position	Nationality	University	Last team/academy
9	Valour FC	Gianfranco Facchineri^{^}	DF	Canada	Windsor	Windsor City FC (L1O)
10	Cavalry FC (from Vancouver FC) (Note: Vancouver FC's second round pick (10th overall) went to Cavalry FC as a result of a trade on December 14, 2023 in exchange for Cavalry's second round pick (15th overall) and future considerations (Ben Fisk).)	Rodane Cato	MF	Canada	Alberta	
11	Atlético Ottawa	Samuel LaPlante	DF	Canada	UQTR	CS Saint-Hubert (L1QC)
12	York United FC	Jason Hartill^{^}	MF	Canada	Cape Breton	Toronto FC Academy (MLS Next)
13	HFX Wanderers FC	Max Bodurtha	MF	Canada	St. Francis Xavier	Whitecaps FC Academy (L1BC)
14	Pacific FC	Ibrahem Saadi	DF	Canada	Western	
15	Vancouver FC (from Cavalry FC)	Thomas Powell^{^}	MF	Canada	Trinity Western	Unity FC (L1BC)
16	Forge FC	Amadou Kone^{^}	FW	Canada	Carleton	Ottawa South United (L1QC)

== Selection statistics ==
=== Draftees by nationality ===
Rank	Country	Selections
1	Canada	15
2	England	1

=== Draftees by university ===
Rank	University	Selections
1	Cape Breton University	3
2	Université du Québec à Trois-Rivières	2
2	Carleton University	2
4	9 universities	1
