= CEPSUM =

Sports centre in Montreal, Quebec

CEPSUM Stadium
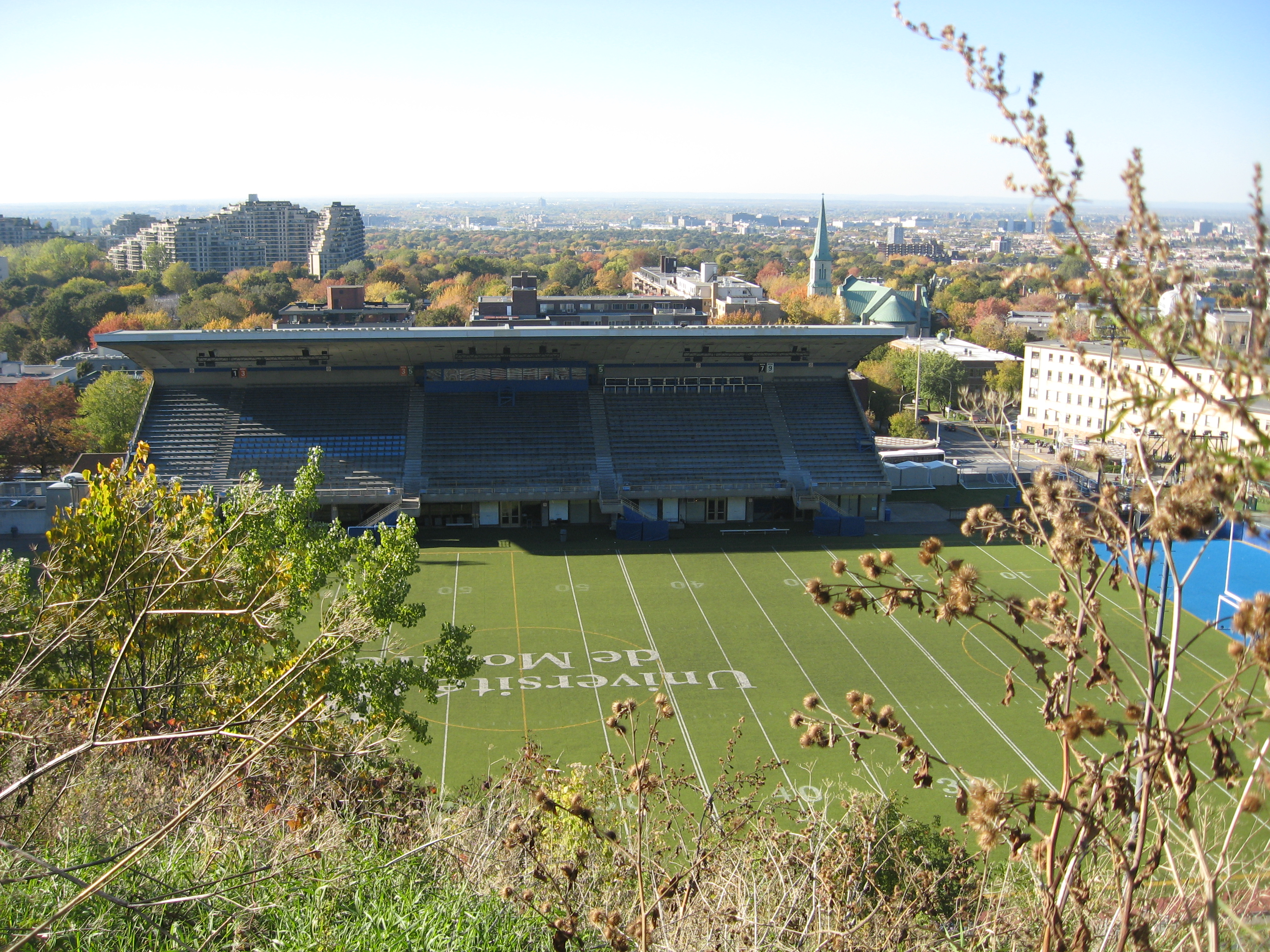
- Interactive map of CEPSUM Stadium
- Location: Boulevard Édouard-Montpetit; Montréal, Quebec
- Coordinates: 45°30′32″N 73°36′41″W
- Owner: Université de Montréal
- Operator: Université de Montréal
- Capacity: 5,100 seats Standing room 7,000
- Public transit: at Édouard-Montpetit station

Tenant
- Université de Montréal Carabins

The CEPSUM (French: Centre d'éducation physique et des sports de l'Université de Montréal, also le Stade du CEPSUM) is a multi-purpose complex sport centre located on the campus of the Université de Montréal in Montreal, Quebec, Canada. The CEPSUM hosts the Montreal Carabins teams.

== History ==
In 1963-1964, the Université de Montréal purchased the building belonging to the Young Men's and Young Women's Hebrew Association, situated on the corner of Park Avenue and Mount Royal Avenue. The Centre at that time had a swimming pool, a gymnasium, a palestre, and an auditorium. The Montreal Carabins of this period used the outside installations of the Jeanne-Mance Park. The Physical educational Department and the Carabins occupied these places until 1976, year of the official inauguration of the CEPSUM which was built for the Montreal Olympics.

The CEPSUM hosted the fencing and the fencing part of the modern pentathlon events during the 1976 Summer Olympics. Following the Olympics, the CEPSUM became the sport centre for the Université de Montréal. In 2004, after almost 30 years of use, important renovation work took place (costing $12 million). These important renovations were completed at the beginning of 2011.

The CEPSUM also accommodates the Sports Medicine department and the clinic of kinesiology of the Université of Montréal.

== Features ==
- An Olympic swimming pool and a diving tank with springboards
- An outdoor stadium of 5,100 seats Standing room 7,000 with a soccer field or Canadian Football
- An ice hockey arena of 2,460 seats (can be converted to a 5,000-seat amphitheatre) - also called Winter Stadium; home to the Montreal Carabins women's ice hockey
- A triple gymnasium and simple volleyball gymnasiums
- A large training room
- A weight room for training
- A sports hall containing a wall for rock climbing
- A running track
- A golf practice area
- Several tennis courts
- Several squash and racquetball courts
- Multifunction rooms
- Changing rooms
- A palestre
- Tunnel to Édouard-Montpetit station

Preceded by Velódromo de Anoeta; San Sebastián	UCI Track Cycling World Championships; Venue; 1974	Succeeded by Stade Vélodrome de Rocourt; Rocourt
