= Sebastian Dzikowski =

Canadian soccer player

Personal information
- Date of birth: August 23, 2001 (age 25)
- Place of birth: Calgary, Alberta, Canada
- Height: 6 ft 4 in (1.93 m)
- Position: Forward

Team information
- Current team: Czarni Połaniec
- Number: 9

Youth career
- Calgary Villains FC
- Calgary Foothills FC
- Cavalry FC

College career
Years	Team	Apps	(Gls)
2021–2023	UBC Thunderbirds	56	(26)

Senior career*
Years	Team	Apps	(Gls)
2024	Vancouver FC	6	(0)
2025	Flota Świnoujście	14	(1)
2025–2026	Wybrzeże Rewalskie Rewal	19	(2)
2026–	Czarni Połaniec	12	(4)
- * Club domestic league appearances and goals as of June 2, 2026

Sebastian Dzikowski (born August 23, 2001) is a Canadian soccer player who plays as a forward for Polish III liga club Czarni Połaniec.

== Early life ==
Dzikowski played youth soccer with Calgary Villains FC, Calgary Foothills FC, and Cavalry FC U20. In June 2013, he played with the Canada West U12 team in the qualification match for the Danone Nations Cup against Canada East.

== University career ==
In May 2019, Dzikowski committed to attend the University of British Columbia to play for the men's soccer team. However, he only began playing in 2021. On September 11, 2021, he scored his first goal in a victory over the Thompson Rivers WolfPack. On October 21, 2022, he scored a brace in a victory over the UBC Okanagan Heat. He opened the 2023 season with a brace against the UNBC Timberwolves on August 25. On September 16, 2023, he scored a hat trick against the MacEwan Griffins. In 2023, he set the UBC single season goals record. In 2023, he was named the Canada West Conference Player of the Year and the U Sports Player of the Year.

== Club career ==
In April 2024, he signed a U Sports contract with Vancouver FC of the Canadian Premier League. In August 2024, he extended his U Sports contract for the remainder of the season, rather than return to university.

On February 12, 2025, he joined Polish club Flota Świnoujście in the fourth-tier III liga. He made his debut on March 8, 2025, recording a goal and an assist in a 2–1 win over Wda Świecie.

Dzikowski spent the first half of the 2025–26 season playing for another III liga side Wybrzeże Rewalskie Rewal. On February 5, 2026, he moved to Czarni Połaniec, also in the fourth division.

== Honours ==
Flota Świnoujście

- Polish Cup (West Pomerania regionals): 2024–25
