= Srdjan Djekanović =

Association football player (born 1983)

Srdjan Djekanovic
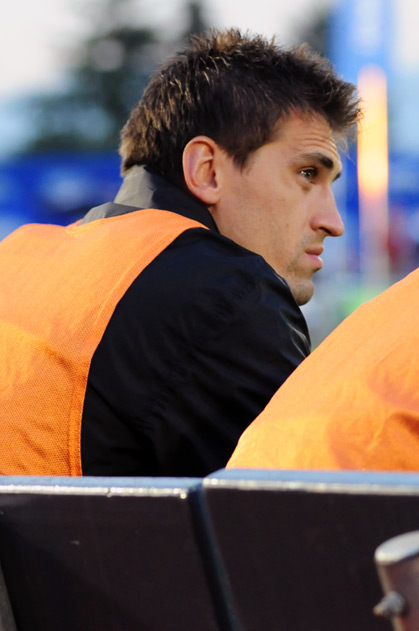
- Djekanovic in 2009

Personal information
- Full name: Srdjan Djekanovic
- Birth name: Srđan Đekanović
- Date of birth: 8 January 1983 (age 43)
- Place of birth: Belgrade, SFR Yugoslavia
- Height: 6 ft 1 in (1.85 m)
- Position: Goalkeeper

Youth career
- Zemun

College career
Years	Team	Apps	(Gls)
2005–2008	UBC Thunderbirds		

Senior career*
Years	Team	Apps	(Gls)
2001–2002	Zemun	0	(0)
2002	→ Zmaj Zemun (loan)	22	(0)
2003	Radnički Obrenovac	0	(0)
2003–2004	Železničar Belgrade	34	(0)
2005–2006	Vancouver Whitecaps	0	(0)
2007	Toronto FC	8	(0)
2008	Vancouver Whitecaps	7	(0)
2009–2010	Montreal Impact	30	(0)

International career
2003	Canada U20	3	(0)

Managerial career
- 2010: Serbian White Eagles Vancouver
- 2010–2013: UBC Thunderbirds (asst)
- 2011: USL Super 20 Revolution
- 2011–2012: CCB U18 Boys
- 2012–2013: Fusion FC
- 2013–2015: Kwantlen Eagles
- * Club domestic league appearances and goals

Srdjan Djekanovic (Serbian: Срђан Ђекановић/Srđan Đekanović; born 8 January 1983) is a retired Canadian professional and Canadian National team soccer player. Djekanovic is currently working as an Elementary School teacher and as the executive director of Port Moody Soccer Club.

== Career ==
=== Early career in Europe ===
Srdjan Djekanovic was born in Belgrade, Serbia and moved to Canada with his family at age 12. Following his graduation from Burnaby South Secondary School, where Djekanovic had success playing soccer and basketball and leading the teams to Provincial Championships, Djekanovic decided to pursue professional soccer in Europe. His professional career in Europe included stops at Zemun, Zmaj, Radnički Obrenovac, and Železničar Beograd in Serbia from 2001 to 2004.

=== North America ===
In 2004 Djekanovic decided to return to Canada and pursue his University Education while playing soccer in North America. He played two seasons of college soccer for the University of British Columbia, with whom he won the CIS National Championships in 2005. At the same time, he played for the Vancouver Whitecaps FC, with whom he also won the USL First Division Championship in 2006.

On 2 June 2007, Djekanovic made his first-ever MLS start in goal in a match versus the Colorado Rapids. He recorded his first victory as his Toronto FC won 2–1, and he earned his first clean sheet on 17 June 2007 in a 4–0 Toronto FC win over FC Dallas. Toronto FC finished the 2007 season with a team record of 6–17–7, while the team record with Djekanovic starting was 2–3–2, with 1.28 goals against average, both by far being the team's best. Djekanovic also played in 10 reserve team games during the 2007 season while with Toronto FC, not allowing a goal in his last 6 games played with the reserves.

Following the 2007 MLS season, he returned to UBC (where he continued his University studies online while playing for Toronto in MLS) and backstopped them to yet another national championship. On 28 February 2008, Djekanovic was signed by his former team, the Vancouver Whitecaps FC. On 13 August 2008, following a disagreement with Head Coach Teitur Thoradson, Djekanovic was released by the Whitecaps. After leaving the Whitecaps, Djekanovic had been linked with a move to MLS Champions at the time Houston Dynamo of the MLS. On 9 January 2009 he signed with Montreal Impact.

He is the first player in Canadian soccer history to play for Vancouver Whitecaps FC, Montreal Impact, and Toronto FC.

=== International ===
Despite being born in Yugoslavia, Djekanovic is a naturalized Canadian citizen. He made three appearances for the Canadian U20 national team in 2003. He was called up to the senior side to face Jamaica on 31 January 2010 but remained on the bench, and participated in many Senior Team camps.

=== Post-Retirement Career and Education ===
Since retiring from professional soccer at the end of the 2010 season, Djekanovic has owned and operated his soccer academy, Primo Soccer. He also worked as a soccer agent, successfully facilitating the transfer of several players from North America to Europe. In 2011, he earned his Education degree from the University of British Columbia and has since taught in both public and private schools. He also holds a master's degree in educational leadership from Concordia University.

== Honours ==
Montreal Impact

- USL First Division Championship: 2009

Vancouver Whitecaps

- USL First Division Championship: 2006

UBC Thunderbirds

- CIS Canadian Interuniversity Sport Championship: 2005, 2007
