= Paul Hamilton (soccer) =

Canadian soccer player

Personal information
- Full name: Paul Hamilton
- Date of birth: March 23, 1988 (age 38)
- Place of birth: Calgary, Alberta, Canada
- Height: 1.85 m (6 ft 1 in)
- Position: Defender

Team information
- Current team: Edmonton Scottish

Youth career
- 1998-2006: Calgary Foothills Soccer Club

College career
Years	Team	Apps	(Gls)
2006	CBU Capers		
2007–2009	Trinity Western Spartans		

Senior career*
Years	Team	Apps	(Gls)
2009	Whitecaps Residency	10	(0)
2011–2012	FC Edmonton	51	(4)
2013	Carolina RailHawks	24	(1)
2015-2024	Edmonton Scottish		

Managerial career
- 2024–: Edmonton Scottish
- * Club domestic league appearances and goals as of June 20, 2014

Paul Hamilton (born March 23, 1988) is a Canadian soccer player who is the head coach for League1 Alberta side Edmonton Scottish. Previously having played professionally for the Vancouver Whitecaps, FC Edmonton and the Carolina Railhawks.

== Career ==
=== Youth and college ===
Hamilton played club soccer for the Calgary Foothills Irish, which he led to a U-18 Alberta Provincial Championship and a silver medal at the National Championships. He began his college soccer career at the University of Cape Breton in 2006, where he was named an AUS second team all-star and AUS Rookie of the Year. He transferred to Trinity Western University in 2007, where he played three years. He was named first team Canada West all-star in each of the 2007, 2008, and 2009 seasons, and second team all-Canadian in 2007 and 2008. In 2009, he was named first team all-Canadian, Canada West Player of the Year and CIS Player of the Year. He played more than 4,500 minutes for the Spartans in his college career, scoring 2 goals while adding 6 assists over that time. Hamilton was inducted into the Canada West Hall of Fame on September 10, 2019.

During his college years, Hamilton also played with the Vancouver Whitecaps Residency team in the USL Premier Development League, and trained with the senior Whitecaps side.

=== FC Edmonton ===
Hamilton signed for FC Edmonton of the new North American Soccer League in 2011, and made his professional debut in the team's first competitive game on April 9, 2011, a 2-1 victory over the Fort Lauderdale Strikers. The club re-signed Hamilton for the 2012 season on October 12, 2011 but he was subsequently released.

=== Carolina RailHawks ===
On April 5, 2013 Hamilton signed with Carolina RailHawks and played 24 games for them during the 2013 season.

=== Edmonton Scottish ===
Hamilton served as captain of the Edmonton Scottish in the Alberta Major Soccer League from 2015-2024. Hamilton won the AMSL League MVP award in the 2016 and 2018 seasons. In 2016 Edmonton Scottish won the 2016 Challenge Trophy with Hamilton being named the tournament MVP.

Hamilton currently serves as the head coach for the Edmonton Scottish United Alberta League1 team, which won the Alberta League1 Regular Season and Championship Final in 2024, granting them access to the 2025 Telus Canadian Championships.
