= Centennial Stadium =

Stadium in Victoria, British Columbia

Coordinates: 48.467478°N 123.315031°W

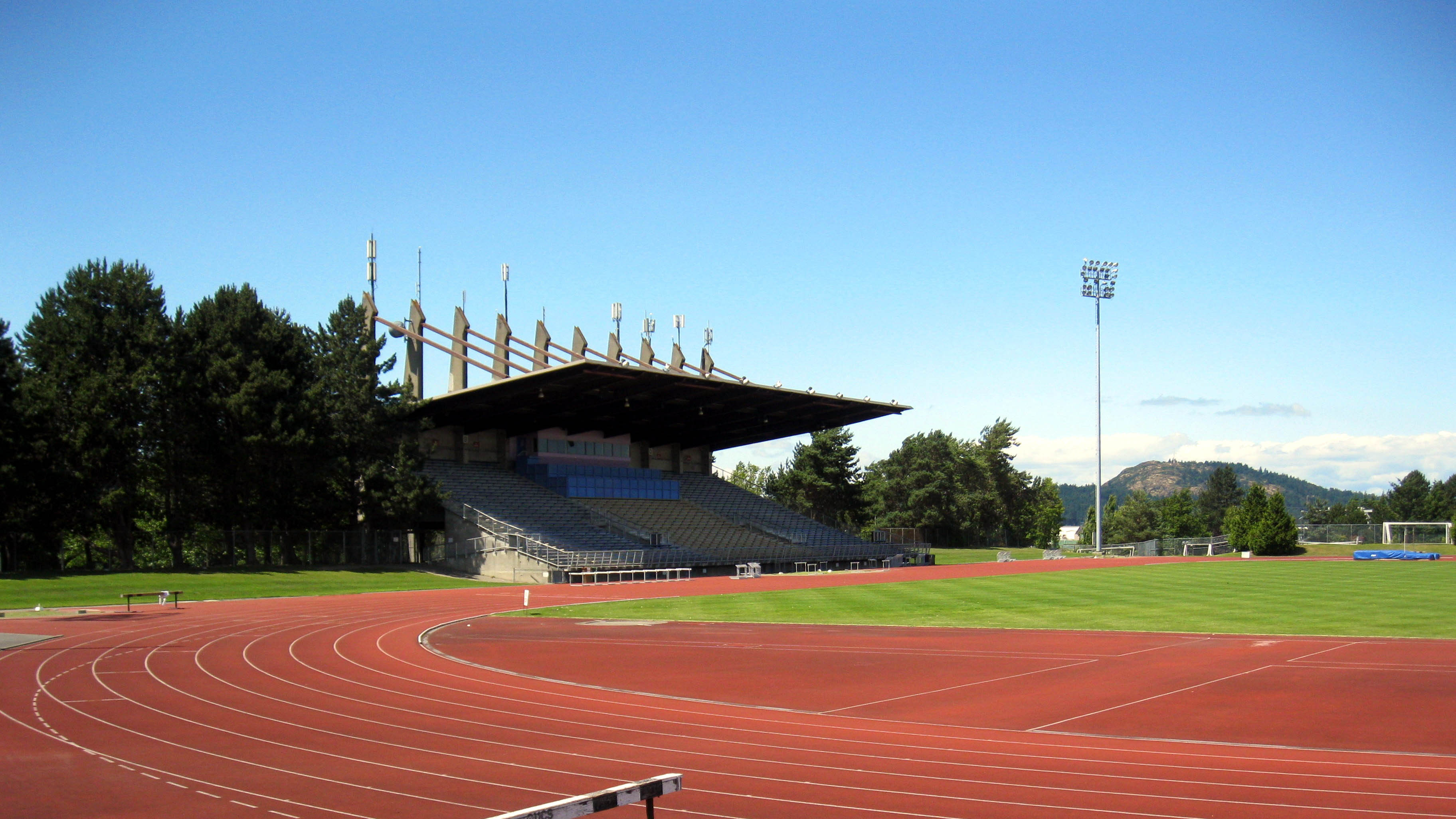
- View of the stadium in 2011
- Interactive map of Centennial Stadium
- Address: Victoria, BC; Canada
- Owner: University of Victoria
- Operator: U of Victoria Athletics
- Capacity: 5,000
- Type: Stadium
- Surface: Natural grass; Rubberized 400m track
- Current use: Association football Track and field

Construction
- Groundbreaking: 1966
- Opened: 1967; 59 years ago
- Cost: $512,084
- Architects: Sidall, Dennis and Associates

Tenants
- Victoria Vikes teams: soccer, track and field; Victoria Highlanders (L1BC) (2016–present)

Website
- uvic.ca/centennial-stadium

Centennial Stadium is a 5000-seat stadium located on the campus of the University of Victoria in Victoria, British Columbia, Canada. The facility was built as a 1967 Canadian Centennial project to celebrate the 100th anniversary of Canadian confederation.

The original seating capacity was 3,000. The venue was renovated and temporarily expanded to 30,000 seats to serve as the main stadium of the 1994 Commonwealth Games. After the Commonwealth Games, the temporary seats were removed, leaving 2,000 new seats opposite the main grandstand for a total of 5,000 seats.

The stadium features a 400m synthetic rubberized track surface, as well as separate areas for long jump/triple jump, high jump, pole vault, discus, hammer, shot put, and javelin. Inside the track is a natural grass field for sports such as football and soccer.

Centennial Stadium is the home of the Victoria Vikes soccer team of U Sports Canada, and Victoria Highlanders FC of League1 British Columbia. It was also used as a soccer venue for the 2002 FIFA U-19 Women's World Championship.
