= Christian Zeppieri =

Canadian soccer player (born 2005)

Personal information
- Date of birth: May 4, 2003 (age 23)
- Place of birth: Vaughan, Ontario, Canada
- Height: 6 ft 1 in (1.85 m)
- Position: Midfielder

Team information
- Current team: Vaughan Azzurri

Youth career
- 2008–2017: Vaughan Azzurri
- 2017–2020: Toronto FC

College career
| Years | Team | Apps | (Gls) |
| 2023– | York Lions | 41 | (25) |

Senior career*
| Years | Team | Apps | (Gls) |
| 2021 | Vaughan Azzurri | 10 | (2) |
| 2023 | Vaughan Azzurri | 19 | (1) |
| 2024–2025 | York United | 10 | (0) |
| 2025 | → York United FC Academy (loan) | 4 | (0) |
| 2026– | Vaughan Azzurri | 1 | (0) |
- * Club domestic league appearances and goals as of April 19, 2026

Christian Zeppieri (born May 4, 2003) is a Canadian professional soccer player who plays for Vaughan Azzurri in the Ontario Premier League.

== Early life ==
Zeppieri played youth soccer with Vaughan Azzurri and the Toronto FC Academy and also spent a year playing club soccer in Italy.

== University career ==
In 2023, Zeppieri began attending York University, where he played for the men's soccer team. In the first game of the 2023 season on September 1, he scored the tying goal via a penalty kick in a 1-1 draw against the Laurier Golden Hawks. In his rookie season, he was twice named the York Lions Athlete of the Week.

He helped York advance to the OUA final, but missed the final due to suspension, after earning a second yellow card in the semi-final after removing his jersey in celebration after scoring a goal.

At the end of his rookie season, he was named the OUA West MVP and an OUA First Team All-Star, and was also named a U Sports First Team All-Canadian. He was also name the school's Male Athlete of the Year for 2023-24.

In 2024, he was again named the OUA West MVP and an OUA West First Team All-Star, and was also award the Joe Johnson Memorial Trophy, as the most outstanding player of U Sports men's soccer. In 2025, he was named the OUA West MVP, an OUA West First Team All-Star, and a U Sports First Team All-Canadian, earning all three honours for the third consecutive year.

== Club career ==
In 2021 and 2023, Zeppieri played with Vaughan Azzurri in League1 Ontario.

At the 2024 CPL-U Sports Draft, Zeppieri was selected in the first round (fourth overall) by York United FC. In April 2024, he signed a U Sports contract with the club, allowing him to maintain his university eligibility.

In August 2024, he departed the club to return to university, with the club retaining his rights for the 2025 season. During the 2025 season, he spent some time with the second team York United FC Academy in League1 Ontario.

In August 2025, he again returned to university, but the club declined his rights for the 2026 season.

== Career statistics ==
As of August 15, 2025

| Club | Season | League | | | Playoffs | | Domestic Cup | | Other | | Total | |
| Club | Season | Division | Apps | Goals | Apps | Goals | Apps | Goals | Apps | Goals | Apps | Goals |
|---|---|---|---|---|---|---|---|---|---|---|---|---|
| Vaughan Azzurri | 2021 | League1 Ontario | 10 | 2 | 0 | 0 | — | | — | | 1 | 0 |
| Vaughan Azzurri | 2023 | League1 Ontario | 19 | 1 | 1 | 0 | 1 | 0 | — | | 1 | 0 |
| Vaughan Azzurri | Total | | 29 | 3 | 1 | 0 | 1 | 0 | 0 | 0 | 31 | 3 |
| York United FC | 2024 | Canadian Premier League | 8 | 0 | 0 | 0 | 0 | 0 | — | | 8 | 0 |
| York United FC | 2025 | Canadian Premier League | 2 | 0 | 0 | 0 | 1 | 0 | — | | 3 | 0 |
| York United FC | Total | | 10 | 0 | 0 | 0 | 1 | 0 | 0 | 0 | 11 | 0 |
| York United FC Academy | 2025 | League1 Ontario Championship | 4 | 0 | — | | — | | 0 | 0 | 4 | 0 |
| Career total | | | 43 | 3 | 1 | 0 | 2 | 0 | 0 | 0 | 45 | 3 |
