= UQTR Patriotes =

Université du Québec à Trois-Rivières

- University: Université du Québec à Trois-Rivières
- Association: U Sports
- Conference: RSEQ; OUA
- Athletic director: André-François Lafond
- Location: Trois-Rivières, Quebec
- Varsity teams: 12 (3 men's, 4 women's, 5 co-ed)
- Arena: Colisée de Trois-Rivières
- Soccer stadium: Stade de l'UQTR
- Other venues: Colisée Mongrain
- Nickname: Pats
- Colours: Green, Orange, and White
- Website: www.uqtr.ca/patriotes/
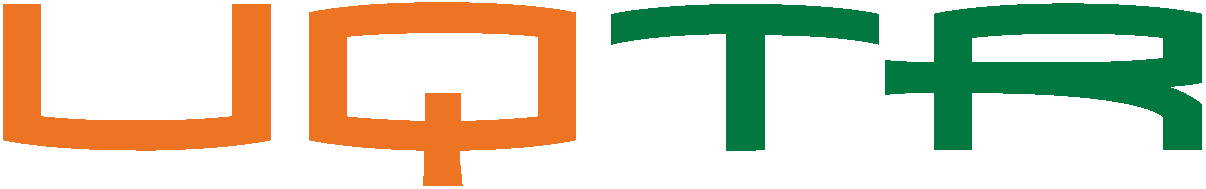

The UQTR Patriotes (French: Patriotes de l'UQTR) are the athletic teams that represent the Université du Québec à Trois-Rivières in Trois-Rivières, Quebec, Canada. The university features teams in swimming, golf, hockey, soccer, cross-country, volleyball and cheerleading. Notably, the men's ice hockey team has won four University Cup national championships since the program was first established in 1969. The men's soccer team has won one national championship, coming in 2019.

== History ==
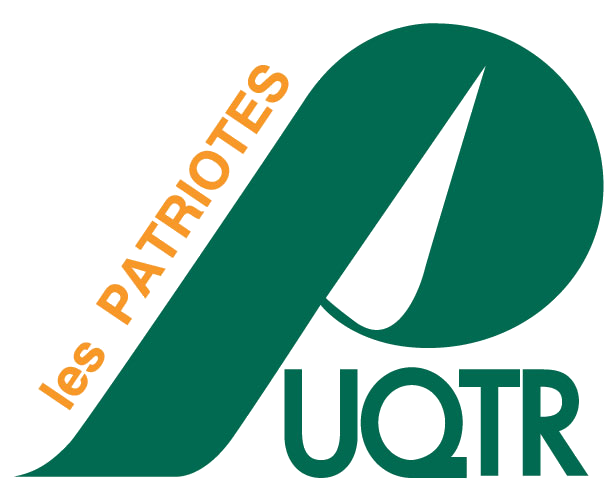
Previous Patriotes logo used until 2019

In 1969, the Université du Québec à Trois-Rivières was established along with its athletics program. The team name "Patriotes" was selected following a contest where it was suggested by Gérald Baril, a history student and hockey player, because of its sense of rallying, dynamism and commitment to the environment. Originally, the team colours were blue, orange, and white, but was change to green, orange, and white in 1976 when the Université du Québec system assigned a distinct colour to each of the universities in their network.

The Patriotes began with an offering of four sports programs, football, men's and women's basketball, and men's hockey. However, with the shifting landscape of philosophy regarding education and sports, football and both basketball programs were all dropped by the 1980s due to a financial crisis. A women's hockey program operated from 1976 to 2000 while the men's and women's soccer programs began in 1985 and 1987, respectively. The women's volleyball program operated from 1978 to 1981 but was the only currently-operating varsity program at UQTR to be revived as the sport was brought back in 2004. With the construction of the Centre for Physical Activity and Sport (CAPS), the Olympic-size swimming pool welcomed the first swimming team at UQTR in 1996. Golf was added in 2000 and cross-country and cheerleading were added as programs in 2010.

The Patriotes introduced a new logo in 2019 for the program's 50th anniversary.

== Varsity teams ==
Men's sports	Women's sports
Ice hockey	Flag football
Soccer	Soccer
Tennis	Tennis
	Volleyball
Co-ed sports
Badminton
Cross country
Golf
Swimming
Track and field

=== Men's hockey ===
The Patriotes men's ice hockey team has been the only program in continuous operation since UQTR was first established in 1969. The team competed in the Ottawa-St. Lawrence Conference (OSLC) for their first two seasons before moving to the Quebec Universities Athletic Association (QUAA) in 1971. The Patriotes won their first conference championship in 1986 and made their first appearance in the University Cup tournament where they finished with a silver medal as the runner-up. The next year, in 1987, the Patriotes repeated as QUAA champions and won the CIAU national championship over the Saskatchewan Huskies, which was also the first national championship win for a Patriotes team.

The team enjoyed a stretch of dominance from 1998 to 2003 there they won five consecutive Queen's Cup championships.

=== Men's soccer ===
The Patriotes men's soccer program was first established in 1985. The team won their first QUAA conference championship in 1995 and qualified for their first national championship tournament that year, finishing in fifth place. The team won conference championships again in 2001 and 2012.

In 2019, the Patriotes finished as runner-ups to the RSEQ championship, but in doing so, they qualified for the national tournament. There, the sixth-ranked Patriotes defeated the UBC Thunderbirds and the Carleton Ravens to qualify for their first national championship game. On November 10, 2019, UQTR defeated the host team Montreal Carabins by a score of 2–0 to win their first U Sports men's soccer championship.

=== Women's soccer ===
The Patriotes women's soccer program was first established in 1987, but have not seen much success. The team has never finished higher than third place in the RSEQ regular season and has never won a conference championship.

=== Women's volleyball ===
The Patriotes women's volleyball program was in operation for three seasons from 1978 to 1981 before being discontinued. A team was revived in 2004 and competed in the RSEQ in the 2005–06 and 2006–07 seasons to little success. An RSEQ Division 2 was established for the 2010–11 seasons where the Patriotes joined and became that division's inaugural champion in 2011. The team has won six Division 2 conference championships. The program began competing in the RSEQ Division 1 in the 2021–22 season.
