= Thompson Rivers WolfPack =

Thompson Rivers University athletic teams

- University: Thompson Rivers University
- Nickname: WolfPack
- Association: U Sports; Canada West Universities Athletic Association; Canadian College Baseball Conference
- Conference: Canada West
- Athletic director: Curtis Atkinson
- Location: Kamloops, British Columbia
- Arena: Tournament Capital Centre
- Soccer stadium: Hillside Stadium
- Colors: Black and Orange
- Mascot: Wolfie
- Website: gowolfpack.ca

The TRU WolfPack are the athletic teams that represent Thompson Rivers University in Kamloops, British Columbia, Canada. They were known as the UCC Sun Demons prior to 2005. The WolfPack became an official member of the Canada West Universities Athletic Association on May 6, 2010.

== Varsity teams ==
All compete in the Canada West Universities Athletic Association, which is a member U Sports — formerly known as Canadian Interuniversity Sport.

Men's sports	Women's sports
Basketball	Basketball
Soccer	Soccer
Volleyball	Volleyball

=== Basketball ===
The WolfPack men's basketball team made it to the CIS Final 8 in 2015–16. They won a silver medal in Canada West in 2016.

=== Soccer ===
The WolfPack men's soccer team won the U-Sports National Championship in 2022, 2–1 over The UBC Thunderbirds. TRU Wolfpack hosted the U-Sports men's soccer Championship in 2022.

The Wolfpack men's soccer team placed third in the U-Sports National Championship in 2017. In 2018 they placed third in Canada West Playoffs.

=== Volleyball ===
WolfPack women's volleyball player Iuliia Pakhomenko was named the Canada West and CIS player of the year in 2016. She was also a Canada West finalist for the BLG Award, which goes to the outstanding university athlete in Canada.

WolfPack women's volleyball players outside hitter Olga Savenchuk (Donetsk, Ukraine) was named to the 2019 Canada West first all-star team and middle Hayley McNaught (Woking, AB) was named to the 2019 Canada West rookie all-star teams.

== Club teams ==
Club sports include baseball, cheerleading, curling, and rodeo.

=== Baseball ===
The WolfPack baseball team won the Canadian College Baseball Conference championship in 2005, 2007 and 2009. The baseball team competes in the Canadian College Baseball Conference. The team has been coached by former MLB pitcher Ray Chadwick since 2003.

=== Cheerleading ===
The Wolfpack Cheerleading teams both placed first at the annual 2019 True North Cheerleading competition held in Edmonton, Alberta. Team Black also received a Full Bid and Team Orange received an At-large Bid to the 2020 University World Cup Cheerleading Championships to be held at the Walt Disney World Resort.

Wolfpack cheerleading is a member of the BC Cheerleading Association

=== Men's Hockey ===
In 2022, the BCIHL announced that an expansion team consisting of players from TRU and the nearby Nicola Valley Institute of Technology in Merritt, called the Logan Lake Miners, would begin play that season. The team would play out of the Logan Lake Recreation Centre. In 2026, the Miners rebranded, taking on the TRU Wolfpack name.

=== Women's Hockey ===
At the same time as the Miner's rebrand, the BCIHL also began a pilot program for women's hockey. The Thompson Rivers Wolfpack are one of 3 teams in this fledgling league, alongside VIU and the Okanagan Lakers.

== Accomplishments ==
Sport	Competititon	Result		Year
Basketball (men's)	CIS		Final 8	2015–16
Basketball (men's)	Canada West		Silver	2016
Baseball
Baseball	Canadian College Baseball Conference		First	2005
Baseball	Canadian College Baseball Conference		First	2007
Baseball	Canadian College Baseball Conference		First	2009
Cheerleading	Sea to Sky International Championship	Team Orange	First	2012
Cheerleading	Sea to Sky International Championship	Team Orange	International Champion - Senior Individual Division	2013
Cheerleading	Sea to Sky International Championship	Team Orange	Third	2013
Cheerleading	Okanagan Cheer Championships	Team Orange	Second - Open Stunt Group Division	2013
Cheerleading	Total Spirit Championships	Team Orange	Third	2013
Cheerleading	Pinnicle Cheer 'Mardi Parti'	Team Orange	First	2014
Cheerleading	Sea to Sky International Championship	Team Orange	Third	2014
Cheerleading	All Things Cheer	Team Orange	Second	2015
Cheerleading	Sea to Sky International Championship	Team Orange	Fourth	2015
Cheerleading	Pinnicle Cheer 'Mardi Parti'	Team Orange	First	2016
Cheerleading	All Things Cheer	Team Orange	First	2016
Cheerleading	Sea to Sky International Championship	Team Orange	Fourth - All Girls	2016
Cheerleading	Pinnicle Cheer 'Mardi Parti'	Team Orange	First	2017
Cheerleading	Western Cheerific Challenge	Team Orange	First	2017
Cheerleading	PACWest ATC Championship	Team Orange	First	2017
Cheerleading	Sea to Sky International Championship	Team Orange	Second	2017
Cheerleading	Pinnicle Cheer 'Mardi Parti'	Team Orange	First	2018
Cheerleading	Cheerfest Championship	Team Orange	First	2018
Cheerleading	PACWest ATC Championship	Team Orange	First	2018
Cheerleading	Sea to Sky International Championship	Team Orange	Second	2018
Cheerleading	Pinnicle Cheer 'Mardi Parti'	Team Black	First	2019
Cheerleading	Pinnicle Cheer 'Mardi Parti'	Team Orange	First	2019
Cheerleading	True North Cheer and Dance Championship	Team Black	First	2019
Cheerleading	True North Cheer and Dance Championship	Team Orange	First	2019
Cheerleading	Sea to Sky International Championship	Team Black	Second	2019
Cheerleading	Sea to Sky International Championship	Team Orange	First	2019
