= CBU Capers =

Athletic teams of Cape Breton University

- University: Cape Breton University
- Nickname: Capers
- Association: U Sports
- Conference: Atlantic University Sport
- Athletic director: John D. Ryan
- Location: Sydney, Nova Scotia
- Varsity teams: 6 (3 men's, 3 women's)
- Basketball arena: Sullivan fieldhouse CBU
- Soccer stadium: Ness Timmons Field
- Colours: Orange, Green, and White
- Mascot: Caper
- Website: www.gocapersgo.ca

The CBU Capers are the athletic teams that represent Cape Breton University in Sydney, Nova Scotia. The teams were known as the UCCB Capers from 1982 to 2005 and their present name reflects the change in the institution's name. There are CBU Capers varsity teams for men's and women's basketball, men's and women's soccer. There is also a CBU Capers women's hockey team which plays in the Atlantic Collegiate Hockey Association.

== Varsity teams ==
| Men's sports | Women's sports |
|---|---|
| Basketball | Basketball |
| Soccer | Soccer |
| Track and field | Track and field |

== Former teams ==
- Ice hockey (men's)

== Championships ==
- AUS Men's Basketball Championships: 1994, 1995, 2010, 2013
- AUS Women's Basketball Championships: 2004, 2006, 2009, 2010, 2011, 2017
- AUS Men's Soccer Championships: 2007, 2009, 2012, 2016, 2017, 2018, 2019, 2021, 2022
- AUS Women's Soccer Championships: 2003, 2005, 2006, 2007, 2008, 2010, 2015
- U Sports women's soccer championships: 2007
- U Sports men's soccer championships: 2017, 2023

== Notable athletes ==
- Peter Schaale, Professional soccer player.
- Isaiah Johnston, Professional soccer player with Huntsville City.
- Jason Hartill, Professional soccer player with Atlético Ottawa.
- Cory Bent, Professional soccer player.
- José Cunha, Professional soccer player.
- Kairo Coore, Professional soccer player.
- Isaiah Johnston, Professional soccer player with HFX Wanderers.
- Paul Hamilton, Head coach for Edmonton Scottish and former soccer player.
- Max Piepgrass, Professional soccer player with Cavalry FC.
