= Montreal Carabins =

Université de Montréal athletic teams

Montréal Carabins
- University: Université de Montréal
- Nickname: Carabins
- Association: U Sports
- Conference: RSEQ
- Athletic director: Manon Simard
- Location: Montreal, Quebec
- Varsity teams: 15
- Football stadium: CEPSUM
- Colours: Royal Blue, White, and Black
- Mascot: Carabin
- Website: carabins.umontreal.ca
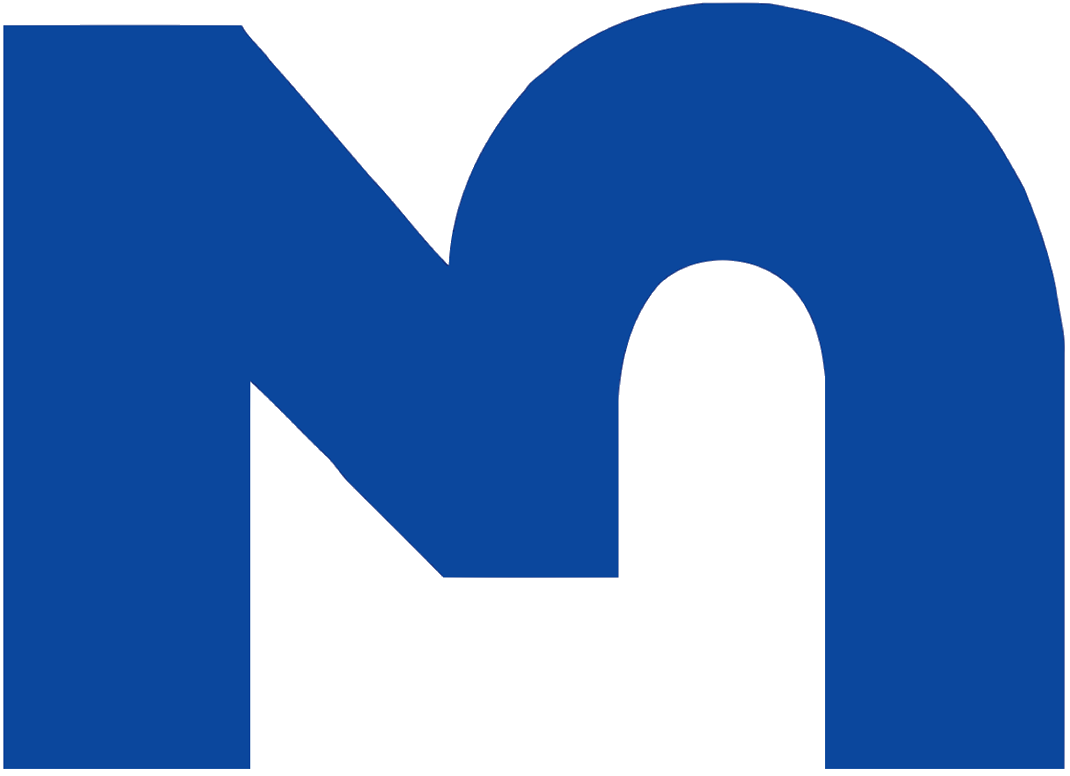

The Montréal Carabins (French: Carabins de Montréal) are the men's and women's athletic teams that represent the Université de Montréal in Montreal, Quebec, Canada. Teams play at the CEPSUM Stadium and at l'aréna du CEPSUM, located at the Université de Montréal campus.

== History ==
year	Event
The beginning of the 1920s	Creation of the club Montreal Carabins
The decades 1940, 1950 and 1960,	Montreal Carabins add several sports teams to affect a summit in the years 1965-1970 both by the number of offered sports activities and by the quality of their organization.
1971	Abandonment of the university sports teams in the club: The financial university budget of the teams is considerably reduced and the freed sums are used to finance non-competitive "popular sport". A long tradition is then broken.
The 70s and 80	Continuation of the activities of Alpine skiing and of badminton without institutional recognition of university
End of the 80s	Return of the teams of swimming (1985) and of volleyball (men in 1988 and women in 1989). The various teams know a lot of success at the beginning of the 1990s while the University knows money troubles.
1994	the big blackout: The budgetary situation of the university does not allow to absorb the expenses of the program of the Carabins and the activities of the teams are suspended.
1995	Relaunching of the program of excellent sport via the physical educational department
1997	Victory in the referendum of the student federation FAECUM: The student Federation agrees to contribute to the financing of the sporting programs up to $100,000. a year.
1999 and 2000	Official membership of the teams of Alpine skiing and badminton. Setting-up of the golf team
2001	Setting-up of the men soccer team
2002	Setting-up of the football team and setting-up the women soccer team
2003 and 2004	Organisation of the Championships of soccer (men's and women's) of SIC (together collaboration with McGill University), setting-up of the volleyball teams (men's and women's)
2007	Setting-up of the tennis teams (men's and women's)
2008	Announcement of the creation of the women hockey team
2009	Setting-up of the women hockey team
2010	Setting-up of cheerleading team
2014	First Dunsmore Cup, Uteck Bowl and Vanier Cup wins

== Varsity teams ==
Men's sports	Women's sports
Football	Flag football
Rugby	Ice hockey
Soccer	Rugby
Volleyball	Soccer
	Volleyball
Co-ed sports
Cross country
Golf
Swimming
Tennis
Track and field

=== Football ===
The Carabins football program was originally in operation from 1966 to 1971, but was cut following a philosophical change with intercollegiate athletics among Quebec universities at the time. As that perception changed, the football team was reinstated in 2002 and has been in continuous operation since. The team has won seven Dunsmore Cup conference championships (2014, 2015, 2019, 2021, 2023, 2025 and 2026) and three Vanier Cups national championship (2014, 2023, 2025).

== Women's ice hockey ==
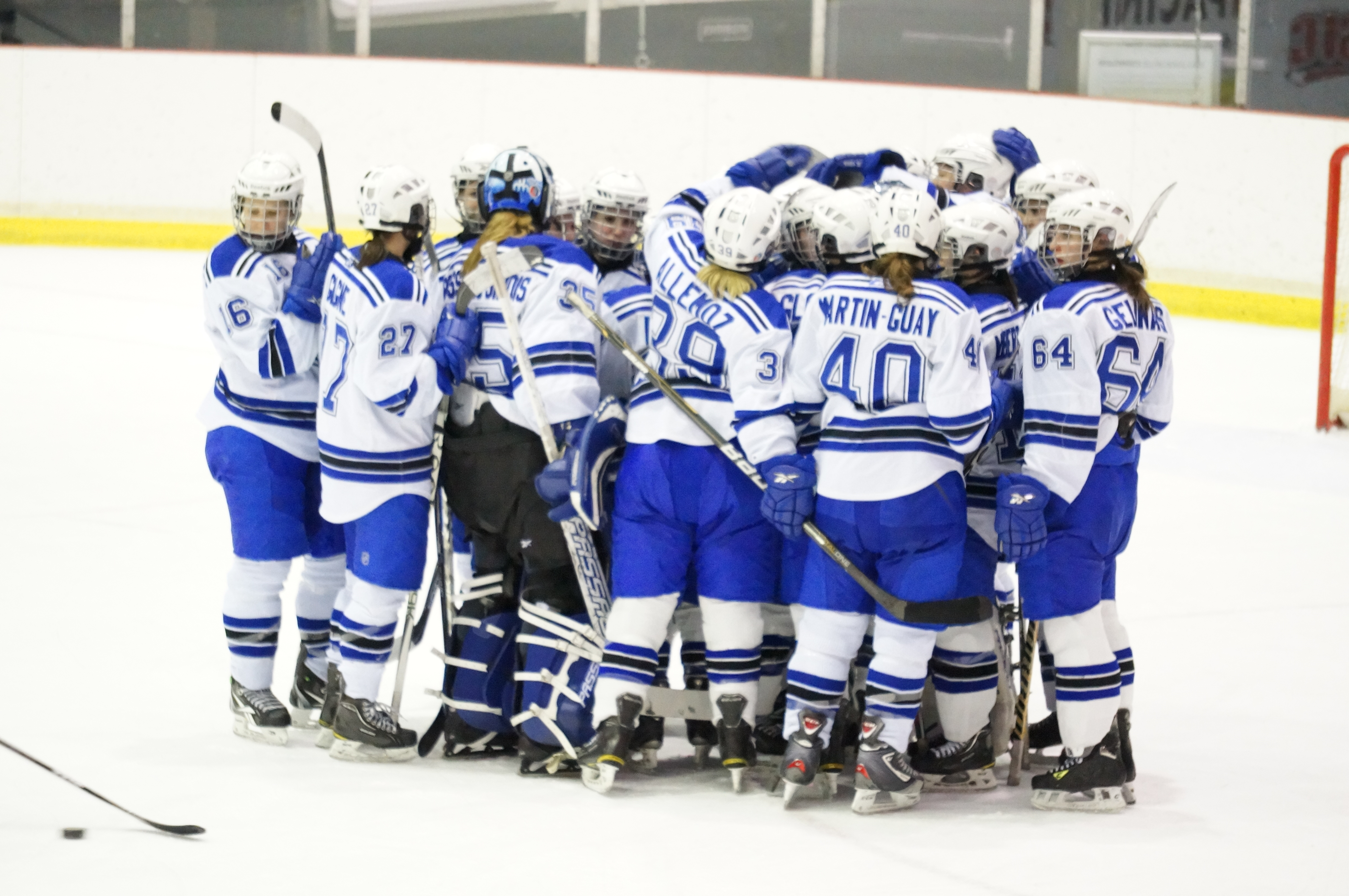
The Carabins in 2012

The 2009-10 season was their inaugural season in the CIS. The Carabins finished second during the regular season and claimed the fifth position in the CIS Canadian championships. In their second season (2010–11), the team ranked in second place in the Québécois conference behind the McGill Martlets. In the 2011 playoffs, the Carabins eliminated the Concordia Stingers but the Carabins are in turn to eliminate in finale by McGill. This elimination did not qualify them for the CIS championships at Waterloo, Ontario.

=== Men's rugby ===
Since their inaugural season in 2012, the Carabins men's rugby program competes at a varsity level against universities from Québec and Eastern Ontario in the RSEQ and has won one RSEQ championship (2016).

=== Women's rugby ===
Since their inaugural season in 2012, the Carabins women's rugby program competes at a varsity level against universities from Québec and Eastern Ontario in the RSEQ conference of U Sports.

== Alpine ski ==
Title(s)	Year(s)
Provincial Champion (men)	1990–91, 1995–96, 1999–00, 2000–01, 2001–02, 2002–03, 2003–04, 2004–05, 2005–06, 2006–07, 2007–08
Provincial Champion (women)	1994–95, 1995–96, 1996–97, 2005–06, 2006–07, 2007–08, 2008–09, 2009–10, 2010–11
Provincial mixed Champion (mixed team men and women)	1994–95, 1995–96, 1996–97, 1999–00, 2000–01, 2001–02, 2002–03, 2003–04, 2004–05, 2005–06, 2006–07, 2007–08, 2010–11

== Badminton ==
Title(s)	Year(s)
Silver medal at Canadian University championship CIS	2006–07, 2007–08
Provincial champion (by mixed team men and women)	1985–86, 1986–87, 1987–88, 1996–97, 2001–02, 2003–04, 2004–05, 2008–09, 2010–11, 2013–14, 2014–15
Men provincial champion	1999–00, 2007–08, 2009–10, 2012–13, 2014–15
Women provincial champion	2007–08, 2009–10, 2010–11, 2011–12, 2012–13

== Cheerleading ==
Title(s)	Year(s)
Provincial champion	2011

The Carabins cheerleading team was created in 2002 at the same time as the rebirth of the Carabins football team. The team has hosted Super Bowl parties in order to finance its activities.

== Golf ==
Title(s)	Year(s)
Provincial champion (men)	2001
Provincial champion (women)	2009, 2010
Island Cup Invitational Champion (women)	2005, 2006, 2007
Champion of Canada East	2006, 2007
St. Andrews Spring Invitational champion (men, NCAA)	2008
NCAA Shootout at Aguila (women)	2011

== Men's soccer ==
Title(s)	Year(s)
Indoor soccer provincial champion	2008, 2016
Champion of the regular season	2007, 2008, 2011, 2013, 2017, 2018, 2021
Provincial champion	2003, 2004, 2005, 2006, 2008, 2011, 2017, 2018, 2019, 2021
Gold medal in the Canadian championship	2018, 2021
Silver medal in the Canadian championship	2017, 2019
Bronze medal in the Canadian championship	2003, 2006, 2008, 2022

== Women's soccer ==
Title(s)	Year(s)
Indoor soccer provincial champion	2006, 2009, 2010, 2011
Champion of the regular season	2008, 2009, 2010, 2011, 2012, 2013, 2018, 2021
Provincial champion	2008, 2009, 2010, 2011, 2013, 2018, 2019
Gold medal in the Canadian championship	2017, 2022
Silver medal in the Canadian championship	2009, 2011, 2013
Bronze medal in the Canadian championship	2008

== Swimming ==
Title(s)	Year(s)
Provincial champion (men)	2003–04, 2004–05, 2006–07, 2013–14, 2014–15
Provincial champion (women)	1990–91, 1991–92, 1992–93, 1993–94, 2009–10, 2010–11, 2012–13, 2013–14, 2014–15
Provincial Champion combiné (mixed team men and women)	2004–05, 2012–13, 2013–14, 2014–15
Silver medal Canadian championship women	2013–14, 2014–15

== Tennis ==
Title(s)	Year(s)
Provincial Champion (men)	1998–99, 1999–00, 2000–01, 2001–02, 2002–03, 2010–11
Grand Chelem Champion (men)	2001–02, 2003–04
Carabins Tournament Champion (men)	2003–04
Champion of the former ligue collégiale-universitaire (men)	2004–05, 2005–06
Women Champion (OUA)	2008–09, 2009–10, 2010–11

== Men's volleyball ==
Title(s)	Year(s)
Provincial champion	1992–93, 2004–05, 2017–18, 2019–20
Champion (regular season)	2004–05, 2017–18, 2019–20
Gold medal at Canadian championship	1970
Silver medal at Canadian championship	1972, 1993
Bronze medal at Canadian championship	1992

== Women's volleyball ==
Title(s)	Year(s)
Provincial champion	1990–91, 1992–93, 1993–94, 2007–08, 2008–09, 2009–10, 2011–12, 2012–13, 2014–15, 2015–16, 2016–17, 2017–18, 2018–19, 2019–20, 2023–24, 2024-25
Champion (regular season)	2006–07, 2007–08, 2008–09, 2009–10, 2011–12, 2013–14, 2014–15, 2015–16, 2016–17, 2017–18, 2019–20, 2023–24, 2024–25
Silver medal at Canadian championship	2008, 2025
Bronze medal at Canadian championship	2009, 2015

== Notable athletes ==
=== Men's soccer ===
- (Armenia) Serge Topalian
- (Canada) Gerardo Argento
- (Canada) Marc-André Bonenfant
- (Canada) Lorenzo Borella
- (Canada) Guillaume Couturier
- (Canada) Maël Demarcy
- (Canada) Laurent Parizeau
- (Canada) Jean-Philippe Roberge-Marin
- (Canada) Ibrahim Baldeh
- (Canada) Christian Nuñez
- (Colombia) Hugo-Pierre Marcotte
- (Democratic Republic of the Congo) Abel Moleka
- (France) Julien Cohen-Arazi
- (France) Gabriel de Foresta
- (France) Augustin Nechad
- (France) Jean-Jacques Seba
- (France) Ugo Robard
- (France) Wandrille Lefèvre
- (Guinea) Boubacar Diallo
- (Haiti) Woodler Elie Blaise
- (Haiti) Peter Thierry Eustache
- (Lebanon) Pascal Aoun
- (Lebanon) Anasse Brouk
- (Madagascar) Herizo Frédéric Ramampiandra
- (Mauritius) Kévin Chan
- (Morocco) Hicham Aaboubou
- (United States) Alhassane Fox
- (France) Kane Limamoulaye
- (France) Oumar Balla Sow
- (Switzerland) Nicolas Suter
- (Syria) Nawar Hanna
- (United Arab Emirates) Sami Sreis

=== Women's soccer ===
- Sandra Couture - 2002-2006
- Véronique Maranda - 2007-2009
- Émilie Mercier - 2005-2009
- Véronique Laverdière - 2006-2011

== See also ==
- U Sports
