= Rowing at the 2000 Summer Olympics – Women's single sculls =

Women's single sculls at the Games of the XXVII Olympiad
- Venue: Sydney International Regatta Centre
- Date: 17–23 September 2000
- Competitors: 19 from 19 nations
- Winning time: 7:28.14

Medalists
| 1st place, gold medalist(s) | | Ekaterina Karsten; Belarus |
| 2nd place, silver medalist(s) | | Rumyana Neykova; Bulgaria |
| 3rd place, bronze medalist(s) | | Katrin Rutschow-Stomporowski; Germany |

The women's single sculls competition at the 2000 Summer Olympics in Sydney, Australia took place at the Sydney International Regatta Centre.

== Competition format ==
This rowing event is a single scull event, meaning that each boat is propelled by a single rower. The "scull" portion means that the rower uses two oars, one on each side of the boat; this contrasts with sweep rowing in which each rower has one oar and rows on only one side (not feasible for singles events). The competition consists of multiple rounds. Finals were held to determine the placing of each boat; these finals were given letters with those nearer to the beginning of the alphabet meaning a better ranking. Semifinals were named based on which finals they fed, with each semifinal having two possible finals.

During the first round six heats were held. The winning boat in each heat advanced to the semifinals, while all others were relegated to the repechages.

The repechages were rounds which offered rowers a chance to qualify for the semi-final. Placing in the repechages determined which semifinal the boat would race in. The top three boats in each repechage moved on to the A/B semifinals, with the bottom three boats going to the C/D semifinals.

Four semifinals were held, two each of A/B semifinals, and C/D semifinals. For each semifinal race, the top three boats moved on to the better of the two finals, while the bottom three boats went to the lesser of the two finals possible. For example, a second-place finish in an A/B semifinal would result in advancement to the A final. Since 19 boats are qualified in this event, the last boat in C/D semifinals is eliminated from the competition.

The fourth and final round was the Finals. Each final determined a set of rankings. The A final determined the medals, along with the rest of the places through 6th. The B final gave rankings from 7th to 12th, the C from 13th to 18th, and so on. Thus, to win a medal rowers had to finish in the top four of their heat, top three of their quarterfinal, and top three of their A/B semifinal to reach the A final.

== Schedule ==
All times are Australian Time (UTC+10)

| Date | Time | Round |
|---|---|---|
| Sunday, 17 September 2000 | 08:30 | Heats |
| Tuesday, 19 September 2000 | 08:30 | Repechages |
| Thursday, 21 September 2000 | 08:30 | Semifinals A/B |
| Thursday, 21 September 2000 | 10:10 | Semifinals C/D |
| Friday, 22 September 2000 | 10:10 | Final B |
| Friday, 22 September 2000 | 11:20 | Final C |
| Saturday, 23 September 2000 | 08:30 | Final |

== Results ==
=== Heats ===
The winner of each heat advanced to the semifinals, remainder goes to the repechage.

==== Heat 1 ====
| Rank | Rower | Country | Time | Notes |
|---|---|---|---|---|
| 1 | Sonia Waddell | New Zealand | 7:40.18 | Q |
| 2 | Gina Douglas | Australia | 7:43.48 | R |
| 3 | Mayra González | Cuba | 7:48.28 | R |
| 4 | Soraya Jadué | Chile | 8:03.52 | R |
| 5 | Fenella Ng | Hong Kong | 8:19.88 | R |

==== Heat 2 ====
| Rank | Rower | Country | Time | Notes |
|---|---|---|---|---|
| 1 | Rumyana Neykova | Bulgaria | 7:36.10 | Q |
| 2 | Agnieszka Tomczak | Poland | 7:43.99 | R |
| 3 | Alison Mowbray | Great Britain | 7:46.73 | R |
| 4 | Paola López | Argentina | 8:06.65 | R |
| 5 | Samia Hireche | Algeria | 8:28.65 | R |

==== Heat 3 ====
| Rank | Rower | Country | Time | Notes |
|---|---|---|---|---|
| 1 | Ekaterina Karsten | Belarus | 7:47.73 | Q |
| 2 | Monica Tranel-Michini | United States | 7:52.05 | R |
| 3 | Maria Brandin | Sweden | 7:53.46 | R |
| 4 | Kristen Wall | Canada | 8:07.76 | R |

==== Heat 4 ====
| Rank | Rower | Country | Time | Notes |
|---|---|---|---|---|
| 1 | Katrin Rutschow-Stomporowski | Germany | 7:32.80 | Q |
| 2 | Yulia Alexandrova | Russia | 7:36.80 | R |
| 3 | Sophie Balmary | France | 7:45.12 | R |
| 4 | Phuttharaksa Neegree | Thailand | 8:22.54 | R |
| 5 | Ibtissem Trimèche | Tunisia | 8:32.05 | R |

=== Repechage ===
First two qualify for semifinals A/B, remainder to semifinals C/D.

==== Repechage 1 ====
| Rank | Rower | Country | Time | Notes |
|---|---|---|---|---|
| 1 | Yulia Alexandrova | Russia | 7:47.04 | A/B |
| 2 | Maria Brandin | Sweden | 7:55.47 | A/B |
| 3 | Paola López | Argentina | 8:03.83 | C/D |
| 4 | Fenella Ng | Hong Kong | 8:16.62 | C/D |

==== Repechage 2 ====
| Rank | Rower | Country | Time | Notes |
|---|---|---|---|---|
| 1 | Alison Mowbray | Great Britain | 7:51.33 | A/B |
| 2 | Monica Tranel-Michini | United States | 7:54.40 | A/B |
| 3 | Soraya Jadué | Chile | 8:02.17 | C/D |
| 4 | Ibtissem Trimèche | Tunisia | 8:28.43 | C/D |

==== Repechage 3 ====
| Rank | Rower | Country | Time | Notes |
|---|---|---|---|---|
| 1 | Mayra González | Cuba | 7:46.25 | A/B |
| 2 | Agnieszka Tomczak | Poland | 7:47.37 | A/B |
| 3 | Phuttharaksa Neegree | Thailand | 8:27.25 | C/D |

==== Repechage 4 ====
| Rank | Rower | Country | Time | Notes |
|---|---|---|---|---|
| 1 | Gina Douglas | Australia | 7:42.67 | A/B |
| 2 | Sophie Balmary | France | 7:51.87 | A/B |
| 3 | Kristen Wall | Canada | 8:05.18 | C/D |
| 4 | Samia Hireche | Algeria | 8:21.67 | C/D |

=== Semifinals ===
==== Semifinals C/D ====
First three qualify to Final C.

===== Semifinal 1 =====
| Rank | Rower | Country | Time | Notes |
|---|---|---|---|---|
| 1 | Kristen Wall | Canada | 8:09.28 | C |
| 2 | Paola López | Argentina | 8:13.05 | C |
| 3 | Ibtissem Trimèche | Tunisia | 8:30.60 | |

===== Semifinal 2 =====
| Rank | Rower | Country | Time | Notes |
|---|---|---|---|---|
| 1 | Soraya Jadué | Chile | 8:01.30 | C |
| 2 | Samia Hireche | Algeria | 8:18.16 | C |
| 3 | Fenella Ng | Hong Kong | 8:21.40 | C |
| 4 | Phuttharaksa Neegree | Thailand | 8:29.60 | |

==== Semifinals A/B ====
First three qualify to Final A, remainder to Final B.

===== Semifinal 1 =====
| Rank | Rower | Country | Time | Notes |
|---|---|---|---|---|
| 1 | Rumyana Neykova | Bulgaria | 7:28.34 | A |
| 2 | Gina Douglas | Australia | 7:32.34 | A |
| 3 | Sonia Waddell | New Zealand | 7:35.24 | A |
| 4 | Mayra González | Cuba | 7:38.97 | B |
| 5 | Maria Brandin | Sweden | 7:49.09 | B |
| 6 | Monica Tranel-Michini | United States | 7:52.92 | B |

===== Semifinal 2 =====
| Rank | Rower | Country | Time | Notes |
|---|---|---|---|---|
| 1 | Katrin Rutschow-Stomporowski | Germany | 7:37.77 | A |
| 2 | Ekaterina Karsten | Belarus | 7:40.36 | A |
| 3 | Yulia Alexandrova | Russia | 7:42.23 | A |
| 4 | Agnieszka Tomczak | Poland | 7:45.64 | B |
| 5 | Sophie Balmary | France | 7:47.16 | B |
| 6 | Alison Mowbray | Great Britain | 7:52.28 | B |

=== Finals ===
==== Final C ====
| Rank | Rower | Country | Time | Notes |
|---|---|---|---|---|
| 1 | Soraya Jadué | Chile | 7:53.56 | |
| 2 | Kristen Wall | Canada | 7:57.94 | |
| 3 | Paola López | Argentina | 8:03.11 | |
| 4 | Fenella Ng | Hong Kong | 8:11.06 | |
| 5 | Samia Hireche | Algeria | 8:12.89 | |

==== Final B ====
| Rank | Rower | Country | Time | Notes |
|---|---|---|---|---|
| 1 | Mayra González | Cuba | 7:32.29 | |
| 2 | Agnieszka Tomczak | Poland | 7:33.20 | |
| 3 | Sophie Balmary | France | 7:34.23 | |
| 4 | Alison Mowbray | Great Britain | 7:35.26 | |
| 5 | Maria Brandin | Sweden | 7:39.44 | |
| 6 | Monica Tranel-Michini | United States | 7:48.95 | |

==== Final A ====
| Rank | Rower | Country | Time | Notes |
|---|---|---|---|---|
| 1st place, gold medalist(s) | Ekaterina Karsten | Belarus | 7:28.14 | |
| 2nd place, silver medalist(s) | Rumyana Neykova | Bulgaria | 7:28.15 | |
| 3rd place, bronze medalist(s) | Katrin Rutschow-Stomporowski | Germany | 7:28.99 | |
| 4 | Yulia Alexandrova | Russia | 7:36.57 | |
| 5 | Gina Douglas | Australia | 7:37.88 | |
| 6 | Sonia Waddell | New Zealand | 7:43.71 | |
