= Shorten =

Shorten may refer to:

- Shorten (codec), for compressing audio data
- Shorten (surname), a surname of English and Irish origin

== See also ==
- Short (disambiguation)
- Shorton (disambiguation)
