= 1987 CFL draft =

Canadian football draft

The 1987 CFL draft composed of eight rounds where 72 Canadian football players were chosen from eligible Canadian universities and Canadian players playing in the NCAA.

== 1st round ==
= CFL Division All-Star	= CFL All-Star	= Hall of Famer

Pick #	CFL team	Player	Position	School
1	Ottawa Rough Riders	Leo Groenewegen	OL	British Columbia
2	Edmonton Eskimos	Blake Marshall	FB	Western Ontario
3	Edmonton Eskimos	Todd Storme	OL	Utah State
4	BC Lions	Tony Visco	DL	Purdue
5	Calgary Stampeders	Rocco Romano	OL	Concordia
6	Winnipeg Blue Bombers	Andrew McConnell	DL	St. Francis Xavier
7	BC Lions	Larry Clarkson	OL	Montana
8	Montreal Alouettes	Matthew Salo	OL	Bishop's
9	Hamilton Tiger-Cats	Joe Germain	WR	Simon Fraser

== 2nd round ==
= CFL Division All-Star	= CFL All-Star	= Hall of Famer

Pick #	CFL team	Player	Position	School
10	Ottawa Rough Riders	Kyle Hall	DB	Western Ontario
11	Montreal Alouettes	Doug Davies	OL	Simon Fraser
12	Ottawa Rough Riders	Patrick Wayne	LB	Simon Fraser
13	BC Lions	Todd Wiseman	DB	Simon Fraser
14	Calgary Stampeders	Andy McVey	FB	Toronto
15	Winnipeg Blue Bombers	Sean Orr	OL	British Columbia
16	BC Lions	Luc Gerritsen	FB	Wilfrid Laurier
17	Edmonton Eskimos	Pierre Vercheval	OG	Western Ontario
18	BC Lions	Paul Shorten	WR	Toronto

== 3rd round ==
= CFL Division All-Star	= CFL All-Star	= Hall of Famer

Pick #	CFL team	Player	Position	School
19	Winnipeg Blue Bombers	Jeff Johnson	FB	Cornell
20	Edmonton Eskimos	David Brathwaite	DL	Toronto
21	Toronto Argonauts	Jake Vaughan	DB	Bishop's
22	Winnipeg Blue Bombers	Steve Rodehutskors	OL/DL	Calgary
23	BC Lions	Karl Jovanovic	OL	Simon Fraser
24	Winnipeg Blue Bombers	Matt MacLeod	K	Oregon
25	BC Lions	Jamie Taras	OG	Western Ontario
26	Edmonton Eskimos	Mark Norman	DB	British Columbia
27	Hamilton Tiger-Cats	Lou Godry	OL	Guelph

== 4th round ==
28. Ottawa Rough Riders Rae Robiritis OC British Columbia

29. Montreal Alouettes David Stroud DB Minot State

30. Saskatchewan Roughriders Oral Sybblis OL Acadia

31. Toronto Argonauts Scott Lesperance OL Colgate

32. Calgary Stampeders Bruno Geremia DB Calgary

33. Winnipeg Blue Bombers Rob Pavan LB Guelph

34. British Columbia Lions Andrew Murray WR Carleton

35. Edmonton Eskimos Jeff Funtasz TB Alberta

36. British Columbia Lions Robin Belanger DB McGill

== 5th round ==
37. Ottawa Rough Riders Brent Lewis LB Western Ontario

38. Montreal Alouettes Andre Schad LB Carleton

39. Saskatchewan Roughriders Bruce Lowe NT Wilfrid Laurier

40. Toronto Argonauts Veron Stiliadis DL/LB Wilfrid Laurier

41. Calgary Stampeders Paul Kerber OL Calgary

42. Winnipeg Blue Bombers Gus Alevizos OL Guelph

43. British Columbia Lions Ray Ljubistic OL Hawai'i-Manoa

44. Edmonton Eskimos Tim Spirel TE Western Ontario

45. Hamilton Tiger-Cats Bill McIntyre WR St. Francis Xavier

== 6th round ==
46. Ottawa Rough Riders Gary Lehmberg DL Simon Fraser

47. Montreal Alouettes Joe Barnabe WR Carleton

48. Saskatchewan Roughriders Joe Marchildon LB York

49. Toronto Argonauts Ron Klein DB Wilfrid Laurier

50. Calgary Stampeders Tony Pierson WR Alberta

51. Winnipeg Blue Bombers John Sutton RB/FB McMaster

52. British Columbia Lions Roald Kovacik LB British Columbia

53. Edmonton Eskimos Darrell Skuse TB Guelph

54. Hamilton Tiger-Cats Joe Fortune OL McMaster

== 7th round ==
55. Ottawa Rough Riders Rick Wolkensperg WR Western Ontario

56. Montreal Alouettes Mike Bertone OL Concordia

57. Saskatchewan Roughriders Kevin Stroud OL Minot State

58. Toronto Argonauts Rob Raycroft OL Toronto

59. Calgary Stampeders Craig Robson OL North Dakota

60. Winnipeg Blue Bombers Allan Lekun OC McGill

61. British Columbia Lions Rob Moretto DB British Columbia

62. Edmonton Eskimos Tony Spoletini TB Calgary

63. Hamilton Tiger-Cats Sean Guy DL Purdue

== 8th round ==
64. Ottawa Rough Riders David Waterhouse TB Ottawa

65. Montreal Alouettes Jordan Leith DB British Columbia

66. Saskatchewan Roughriders Byron McCorkell DT Saskatchewan

67. Toronto Argonauts Dave Kohler LB Wilfrid Laurier

68. Calgary Stampeders Kent Lapa DL Murray State

69. Winnipeg Blue Bombers Pete Riley QB Livingston

70. British Columbia Lions Mike Murphy DB Central Washington

71. Edmonton Eskimos Ken Hoppus OL Whitworth

72. Hamilton Tiger-Cats Greg Doren OL Nevada-Reno
