= Bill McIntyre (Canadian football) =

No. 10
- Position: Wide receiver

Personal information
- Born: July 9, 1964 (age 62); Toronto, Ontario

Career information
- University: St. Francis Xavier University
- CFL draft: 1987: 5th round, 45th overall pick

Awards and highlights
- St. Francis Xavier Sports Hall of Fame, Canadian Interuniversity Athletics Union record for inter-collegiate receptions. St Francis Xavier record for all-time leader in receptions and yards

Bill McIntyre (born July 9, 1964, in Toronto, Ontario) was a wide receiver who was a 5th round draft pick (45th overall) to the Hamilton Tiger-Cats in 1987. He had jersey number 10.

McIntyre played college football from 1983 to 1987 at St. Francis Xavier University, where he set a Canadian Interuniversity Athletics Union (now known as Canadian Interuniversity Sports) record with his 155th inter-collegiate reception. He finished his career with 163 receptions. McIntyre still holds the record for all-time leader in receptions and yards in St. Francis Xavier history.

Bill McIntyre was inducted into the St. Francis Xavier Sports Hall of Fame on October 9, 2014.
