= Steve Rodehutskors =

Canadian football player (1963–2007)

No. 57
- Position: Offensive lineman

Personal information
- Born: November 27, 1963; Calgary, Alberta, Canada
- Died: October 25, 2007 (aged 43)
- Listed height: 6 ft 6 in (1.98 m)
- Listed weight: 265 lb (120 kg)

Career information
- University: Calgary
- CFL draft: 1987: 3rd round, 22nd overall pick

Career history
- 1987–1991: Winnipeg Blue Bombers
- 1992–1993: BC Lions
- 1993–1994: Toronto Argonauts
- 1994: Saskatchewan Roughriders*
- * Offseason or practice squad member only

Awards and highlights
- 2× Grey Cup champion (1988, 1990)

Steve Rodehutskors (November 27, 1963 – October 25, 2007) was a Canadian professional football offensive lineman who played seven seasons in the Canadian Football League (CFL) with the Winnipeg Blue Bombers, BC Lions and Toronto Argonauts. He was drafted by the Blue Bombers in the third round of the 1987 CFL draft. He played CIS football at the University of Calgary. Rodehutskors was also a member of the Saskatchewan Roughriders

== College career ==
Rodehutskors played CIS football for the Calgary Dinos, winning the 21st Vanier Cup in 1985. He had not played football before his time with the Dinos, previously having participated in high school basketball.

== Professional career ==
Rodehutskors was selected by the Winnipeg Blue Bombers of the CFL with the 22nd pick in the 1987 CFL draft. He played for the Blue Bombers from 1987 to 1991, winning the 76th Grey Cup in 1988 and the 78th Grey Cup in 1990. He signed with the CFL's BC Lions in 1992 and played for them from 1992 to 1993. Rodehutskors was traded to the Toronto Argonauts early in the 1993 season for a first round pick in the 1994 CFL draft. He was released by the Argonauts before the start of the 1994 season. He signed with the Saskatchewan Roughriders of the CFL during the 1994 off-season and was released by the team prior to the 1994 season.

== Personal life ==
Rodehutskors worked briefly as a stockbroker after his football career before becoming a veterinarian. He died of cancer on October 25, 2007.
