= Applewood Heights Secondary School =

Location
- 945 Bloor Street East; Mississauga, Ontario, L4Y 2M8; Canada; 43.6071°N 79.605°W

Information
- School type: State High school
- Founded: 1966
- School board: Peel District School Board
- Superintendent: Dhalia Battick
- Area trustee: Lucas Alves; Susan Benjamin; Evelyn Lee (Student Trustee for Schools south of Hwy 401)
- Principal: Michael Bowman
- Grades: 9-12
- Enrolment: 1,235 (June 3, 2023)
- Language: English, French immersion
- Colours: Red, White and Blue
- Mascot: The Axeman
- Team name: Applewood Axemen
- Website: applewoodheights.peelschools.org
- Last updated: June 3, 2023

Applewood Heights Secondary School is a public secondary school in Mississauga, Ontario, Canada and is part of the Peel District School Board. It offers a Specialist High Skills Major in sports (SHSM), and a regional sports program (RSP).

== Notable students and alumni ==
- Taurean Allen, CFL player for the Calgary Stampeders
- Danny Antonucci, animator
- Tony Burgess, author
- Doug Davies, CFL lineman
- Paul Fromm, a former teacher at the school, who is also a white supremacist and neo-Nazi
- Tom Kostopoulos, NHL player for the New Jersey Devils
- Luc Mullinder, CFL player
- Brandon Onkony, Swiss professional soccer player playing for Hobro IK in the Danish Superliga
- PartyNextDoor, signed to Drake's OVO Sound label
- Aqsa Parvez, murder victim
- Rathika Sitsabaiesan, MP for Scarborough—Rouge River

== See also ==
- Education in Ontario
- List of secondary schools in Ontario
