= Canadian University Rowing Association =

Governing body for rowing in Canada

Canadian University Rowing Championship
- Current season, competition or edition: 2025–2026 CURA season
- Sport: Rowing
- Founded: 1997; 29 years ago
- No. of teams: 27
- Country: Canada
- Website: http://rowingcanada.org/discover-rowing/types-rowing/university

The Canadian University Rowing Association is the governing body for post-secondary rowing in Canada. Its purpose is to promote participation in rowing through academic and sporting excellence at Canadian Universities. The Canadian University Rowing Championship (CURC) is hosted annually in early November by one of the member institutions. It is a showcase of top Canadian Under 23 and Senior rowing talent where many of the medalist and finalist athletes have represented or will go on to represent Canada internationally.

== Championship events ==
According to the CURA Playing Regulations, CURC events are the same for Men and Women and points are awarded to participating teams for 1st through 12th place in each event (the current points system is displayed here, but points have been adjusted since the competition's founding in 1997):

Points per position
Event	1st	2nd	3rd	4th	5th	6th	7th	8th	9th	10th	11th	12th
Lwt 1x	15	12	10	9	8	7	6	5	4	3	2	1
Hwt 1x	15	12	10	9	8	7	6	5	4	3	2	1
Lwt 2x	20	16	12	10	9	8	7	6	5	4	3	2
Hwt 2-	20	16	12	10	9	8	7	6	5	4	3	2
Lwt 4+	25	20	15	12	10	9	8	7	6	5	4	3
Hwt 8+	40	35	30	25	22	20	19	18	17	16	15	14

== Men's national championship titles by institution ==
Institution	Number of championship titles	Most recent title
University of British Columbia	11	2026
University of Victoria	7	2021
University of Western Ontario	6	2015
Brock University	5	2012

== Women's national championship titles by institution ==
Institution	Number of championship titles	Most recent title
University of Victoria	14	2024
University of Western Ontario	8	2017
University of British Columbia	4	2021
Queen's University	2	2025

== National championships ==
The Men's and Women's teams with the most points are crowned National Champions and presented with the National Championship Banners following the regatta.

Year	Location	Host institution(s)	Overall men's champions	Overall women's champions
2026	Fanshawe Lake, London, ON	University of Western Ontario	University of British Columbia	University of Victoria
2025	Olympic Basin, Montreal, QC	McGill University	University of British Columbia	Queen's University
2024	Elk Lake, Victoria, BC	University of Victoria	University of British Columbia	University of Victoria
2023	Burnaby Lake, Burnaby, BC	University of British Columbia	University of British Columbia	University of Victoria
2022	Martindale Pond, St. Catharines, ON	Brock University	University of British Columbia	University of Victoria
2021	Welland International Flatwater Centre, Welland, ON	Brock University	University of Victoria	University of British Columbia
2020	Cancelled due to the COVID-19 pandemic			
2019	Elk Lake, Victoria, BC	University of Victoria	University of British Columbia	University of British Columbia
2018	Martindale Pond, St. Catharines, ON	Brock University	University of British Columbia	University of British Columbia
2017	Lake Burnaby, Burnaby, BC	University of British Columbia	University of British Columbia	University of Western Ontario
2016	Welland, ON	University of Western Ontario & University of Guelph	University of British Columbia	University of Western Ontario
2015	Lochaber, Antigonish, NS	St. Francis Xavier University	University of Western Ontario	University of Western Ontario
2014	Elk Lake, Victoria, BC	University of Victoria	University of British Columbia	University of Western Ontario
2013	Notre Dame Island, Montreal, QC	McGill University	University of Western Ontario	University of Western Ontario
2012	Lake Burnaby, Burnaby, BC	University of British Columbia	Brock University	University of Victoria
2011	Welland, ON	University of Western Ontario	University of Western Ontario	University of Victoria
2010	Elk Lake, Victoria, BC	University of Victoria	University of Victoria	University of Victoria
2009	Notre Dame Island, Montreal, QC	McGill University	University of Victoria	University of Western Ontario
2008	Fort Langley, BC	University of the Fraser Valley & University of British Columbia	University of Western Ontario	University of Western Ontario
2007	Welland, ON	Brock University	University of Western Ontario	Queen's University
2006	Martindale Pond, St. Catharines, ON	Brock University	University of Western Ontario	University of Western Ontario
2005	Elk Lake, Victoria, BC	University of Victoria	University of British Columbia	University of Victoria
2004	Notre Dame Island, Montreal, QC	McGill University	Brock University	University of British Columbia
2003	Elk Lake, Victoria, BC	University of Victoria	Brock University	University of Victoria
2002	Martindale Pond, St. Catharines, ON	Brock University	Brock University	University of Victoria
2001	Martindale Pond, St. Catharines, ON	Brock University	University of Victoria	University of Victoria
2000	Elk Lake, Victoria, BC	University of Victoria	University of Victoria	University of Victoria
1999	Martindale Pond, St. Catharines, ON	Brock University	Brock University	University of Victoria
1998	Elk Lake, Victoria, BC	University of Victoria	University of Victoria	University of Victoria
1997	Elk Lake, Victoria, BC	University of Victoria	University of Victoria	University of Victoria

== Awards ==
Each year following competition, the association presents a number of individual awards. Recipients are determined by a gathering of all head coaches present following the final race and handed out at the awards banquet later in the evening.

Male Athlete of the Year

Year	Athlete(s)	Institution(s)
1997		
1998		
1999		
2000		
2001		
2002		
2003		
2004		
2005		
2006		
2007		
2008		
2009		
2010		
2011		
2012		
2013		
2014		
2015		
2016		
2017	Aaron Lattimer	University of British Columbia
2018	Alex Bernst	Queen's University
2019	Curtis Ames	University of Western Ontario
2020	Cancelled due to the COVID-19 pandemic	
2021	Liam Smit	University of British Columbia
2022	Stephen Harris; Thomas Markewich; Patrick Keane	Brock University; Brock University; University of Victoria
2023	Stephen Harris	Brock University
2024	Stephen Harris	Brock University
2025	Riley Watson	Brock University

Female Athlete of the Year

Year	Athlete(s)	Institution(s)
1997		
1998		
1999		
2000		
2001		
2002		
2003		
2004		
2005		
2006		
2007		
2008		
2009		
2010		
2011		
2012		
2013		
2014		
2015		
2016		
2017	Larissa Werbicki	University of Western Ontario
2018	Laura Court	Brock University
2019	Hayley Chase	Laurentian University
2020	Cancelled due to the COVID-19 pandemic	
2021	Piper Battersby	University of Victoria
2022	Alizée Brien	University of Montreal
2023	Kennedy Burrows	University of Ottawa
2024	Sai Sai Faubert	University of Victoria
2025	Julia Teixeira	Queen's University
2026	Tess Friar	Trent University

== Trophies ==
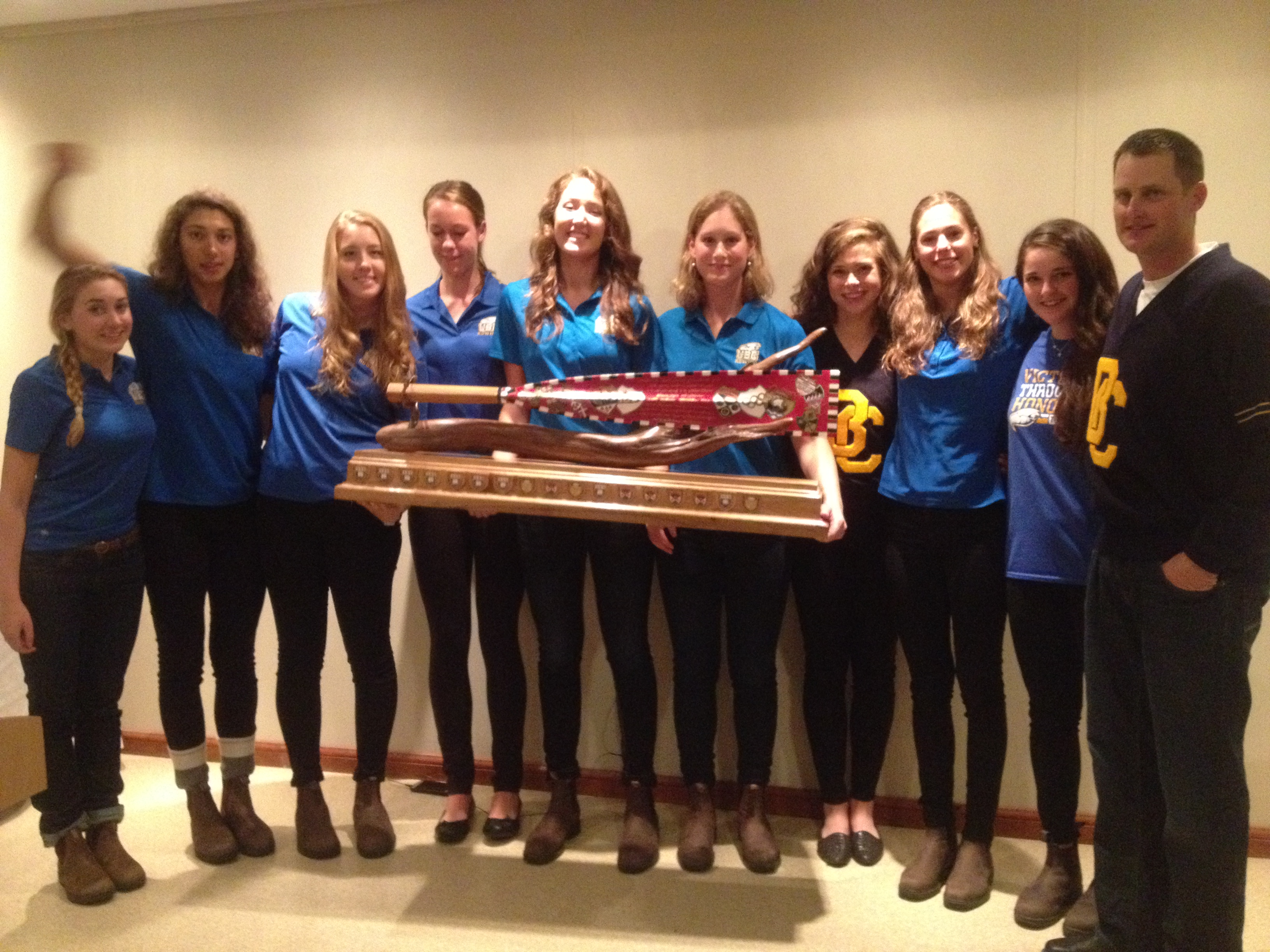
The University of British Columbia Women's Eight are presented with the Jane Thornton Trophy following their victory in the W8+ event at the 2014 Canadian University Rowing Championships.

As well as the trophies presented to the overall Men's and Women's teams with the most points, event trophies are presented to the winning crews in the Men's and Women's Eights events. All event trophies have been back dated to include previous winners of the event in question.

The Book of Honour: Men's Eight winners are presented with the Book of Honour, in which the names of all members of each year's winning Men's Eight are listed by hand in calligraphy on a new page along with a picture of the crew, winning time, etc. The Book of Honour was the first event award created and first presented before 2012 by members of past winning Men's Eights from numerous Canadian universities including Robert Weitemeyer (UBC), Peter McClelland (University of Western Ontario), and Adam Kreek (University of Victoria). The initials of the contributors are on an early page in the book itself.

The Jane Thornton Trophy: Women's Eight winners are presented with the Jane Thornton Trophy, which consists of a decorated wooden oar blade mounted on a beaver-chewed piece of driftwood set on a wooden base, on which a small wooden shield with the winning university's institutional coat of arms is placed. The trophy is named in honour of Jane Thornton, one of the most successful university rowers in the conference's history. The trophy was first presented in 2013. The trophy is constructed of a blade and oarlock from the Fredericton Rowing Club, where Thornton learned to row; similarly, the driftwood was taken from the Saint John River in Fredericton; the base was built by Thornton's father using local wood.

== Results ==
=== 2025 ===
Event		Gold		Silver		Bronze	
Men	M1x	Western University Oliver Baker	7:22.218	University of British Columbia Owen Bartel	7:24.953	Brock University Charles-Etienne Tabet	7:27.093
Men	LM1x	University of Victoria Giancarlo DiPompeo	7:33.734	Brock University Riley Watson	7:38.378	University of British Columbia Jack Harris	7:47.943
Men	LM2x	Brock University Connor Dodds Riley Watson	6:47.966	Queen's University Liam Shapland Nigel Radhakrishnan	6:50.496	University of Victoria Giancarlo DiPompeo Oliver Howard-Batek	6:52.642
Men	M2-	University of British Columbia Liam Smit Adrian Breen	6:50.878	Mcgill University Edison Luke Markus Maile	7:00.962	University of Calgary Angus Robertson Albert Harkema	7:04.282
Men	LM4+	Brock University Riley Watson Connor Dodds Sawyer Dalton Joseph Coughler Serafina Dell	6:44.111	University of British Columbia Henry Sowle Peter Scaccabarozzi Jack Harris Simon DeLuca Edward Lalonde	6:45.483	Queen's University Liam Shapland Leo Biancaniello Nigel Radhakrishnan Alexander Ladage Lauren Schwandt	6:46.432
Men	M8+	University of British Columbia Adrian Breen Benjamin Buchheit Oliver Page-Kuhr Liam Smit Matthias Shorter Maijken Meindertsma Bennett Maijer Owen Bartel Oscar Wostenholme	5:55.829	University of Victoria Dominik Crnjak Conor Dillon Calum Murphy Daniel Mielecki Drew Timlin Thomas Boruta Gabriel Dyer Simon Whittaker Sascha Jansen-Rudan	6:01.669	Western University Mathias Essig Oliver Baker Aidan Hembruff Adam Griesbach Kyle Spenard Sebastian Friedrich Yap Kyland Mels-Williams Matt Yates Teija Patry	6:02.001
Women	LW1x	l'Universite de Montreal Isabel Izquierdo-Bernier	8:21.008	Queen's University Julia Teixeira	8:24.202	Carleton University Rosemary O'Brien	8:29.129
Women	W1x	University of British Columbia Gabrielle Yarema	8:10.992	Western University Morgan Rosts	8:11.422	University of Victoria Pepper Howe	8:17.310
Women	LW2x	Queen's University Gillian Jansen Julia Teixeira	7:43.563	University of Victoria Kate Watson Charisse (Sai Sai) Faubert	7:49.168	Western University Kairsen Frick Mary Brooksbank	7:54.202
Women	W2-	Western University Morgan Rosts Kira Mels-Williams	7:44.804	Queen's University Kaija Erickson Jacquie Groenewegen	7:47.973	Brock University Isabella Durcak Zoe Durcak	7:49.791
Women	LW4+	Queen's University Gillian Jansen Julia Teixeira Isidora Ferguson Isabel Geiger Nicole Schmidt	7:39.077	Western University Kairsen Frick Mary Brooksbank Hayley Buchanan Sydney McArthur Sophie Rorabeck	7:44.492	University of Victoria Sophia Regosa Kate Watson Zoe Scogna Elena Masyte Sadie Green	7:48.580
Women	W8+	Queen's University Abby Speirs Kaija Erickson Jacquie Groenewegen Seija Erickson Bryn Bain Alexis McLaughlin Ceilidh MacDonald Julia Schuurmans Jess Stephenson	6:46.156	Brock University Zoe Durcak Isabelle Durcak Teagan Orth Jalyn Mowry Genavieve Jopling Ana Cumming Lila Lane Kristina Harris Haley Knott	6:48.337	Western University Ella Gemin Morgan Rosts Kira Mels-Williams Kya Mason-Wetherill Mackenzie Anderson Danielle Hart Victoria Ball Meaghan Daub Sophie Rorabeck	6:51.042

=== 2024 ===
Event		Gold		Silver		Bronze	
Men	M1x	University of British Columbia Liam Smit	6:59.59	Brock University Michael Ciepiela	7:03.47	University of Victoria Andrew Hubbard	7:06.19
Men	LM1x	Brock University Stephen Harris	6:53.71	University of Victoria Giancarlo DiPompeo	6:56.01	University of British Columbia Emerson Crick	7:03.69
Men	LM2x	Brock University Connor Dodds Charles-Etienne Tabet	6:09.64	University of British Columbia Johnathan McLeod Emerson Crick	6:10.89	University of Victoria Giancarlo DiPompeo Louis Ferraro	6:12.36
Men	M2-	University of British Columbia Maijken Meindertsma Joel Cullen	6:26.11	Western University Adam Griesbach Aidan Hembruff	6:26.68	University of Victoria Michael Caryk Quinn Storey	6:39.21
Men	LM4+	Queen's University Lucas Celia Liam Shapland Leo Biancaniello Nigel Radhakrishnan Lauren Schwandt	6:16.05	Brock University Connor Dodds Archer Larochelle Riley Watson Charles-Etienne Tabet Serafina Dell	6:16.86	University of Victoria Louis Ferraro Oliver howard-batek James Gemmill Giancarlo DiPompeo Josie Roelofs	6:18.98
Men	M8+	University of British Columbia Liam Smit Maijken Meindertsma Joel Cullen Samuel Harris Robert Walsh Braden Durcak Owen Bartel Adrian Breen Oscar Wostenholme	5:31.56	Western University Aidan Hembruff Adam Griesbach Kyland Mels-Williams Matt Yates Richard Magony Sebastian Friedrich Yap Oliver Baker William Borritt Teija Patry	5:34.63	Brock University Maddox Harrison Michael Ciepiela Stephen Harris Keithan Woodhouse Riley Watson Euan Coulson Ian Doctor Chris Gomez Serafina Dell	5:36.49

=== 2023 ===
Event		Gold		Silver		Bronze	
Men	M1x	University of British Columbia Owen Bartel	7:21.660	Brock University Stephen Harris	7:29.013	Western University Connor Newell	7:36.538
Men	LM1x	University of Victoria Giancarlo DiPompeo	7:21.756	University of British Columbia Emerson Crick	7:24.784	Brock University Charles-Etienne Tabet	7:27.225
Men	LM2x	Brock University Stephen Harris Riley Watson	6:41.263	University of British Columbia Emerson Crick Nikolas Schramm	6:43.543	Queen's University Alex Abicht Lucas Celia	6:46.483
Men	M2-	University of British Columbia Julian Black Axel Ewashko	6:43.808	Western University Sam Stewart Aidan Hembruff	6:48.227	Queen's University Kyle Nummi Robert Bryden	6:51.645
Men	LM4+	Brock University Connor Dodds Chris Gomez Stephen Harris Charles-Etienne Tabet Clara Sebastianelli	6:32.997	University of British Columbia Nikolas Schramm Emerson Crick Peter Scaccabarozzi Johnathan McLeod Edward Lalonde	6:34.921	Queen's University Lucas Celia Alex Abicht Nigel Radhakrishnan Leo Biancaniello Jess Stephenson	6:41.542
Men	M8+	University of British Columbia Julian Black Axel Ewashko Adrian Breen Julien Wiese Aidan Della Siega Owen Bartel Samuel Harris Benjamin Buchheit Oscar Wostenholme	5:45.198	University of Victoria Spencer Lewis Quinn Storey Connor Attridge Kai Bartel Michael Caryk Victor Lefebvre Aidan Carr Jesse Harold Nicholas Murray-Coplen	5:48.914	Western University Sam Stewart Aidan Hembruff Adam Greisbach Richard Magony Matt Yates Kai Elrick Connor Newell William Borritt Ever Prishkulnik	5:52.590
Women	W1x	Western University Rachel Weber	8:10.320	University of Victoria Margaret Hemphill	8:14.163	University of British Columbia Tyla Casey-Knight	8:17.761
Women	LW1x	University of Ottawa Kennedy Burrows	8:05.025	Dalhousie University Sophie Inkpen	8:08.043	Queen's University Julia Teixeira	8:08.392
Women	LW2x	Brock University Zoe Durcak Isabella Durcak	7:38.870	University of British Columbia Mary Law Meghan Camplin	7:39.718	University of Victoria Sophia Regosa Paige Letham	7:53.629
Women	W2-	University of British Columbia Gabriella Worobec Sally Jones	7:34.495	University of Victoria Nicole Cusack Mikaela Holthuis	7:37.308	Queen's University Ceilidh MacDonald Claire Ellison	7:40.760
Women	LW4+	Queen's University Emily Pain Lauren Matai Brigitte Gaudert Gillian Jansen Nicole Schmidt	7:27.220	University of Victoria Sophia Regosa Paige Letham Elena Masyte Sai Sai (Charise) Faubert Helen Ross	7:30.491	University of Western Ontario Hayley Conrad Rebecca Nichol Kaitlyn Hall Ashley Skinkle Enna Sue	7:35.901
Women	W8+	University of Victoria Danica Ariano Margaret Hemphill Nicole Cusack Mikaela Holthuis Julia Reed Gabrielle Kieser Sarah Stormont Kaliya Javra Sofie Hof	6:31.062	University of British Columbia Gabriella Worobec Sally Jones Jackie Blunt Laura Stankiewicz Katherine Breen Tyla Casey-Knight Caitlin Lawrence Lyndsey Bryden Isabella Howley	6:34.109	Western University Rachel Weber Gabrielle Yarema Marissa Vanderploeg Olivia Calbeck Danielle Grasman Cheyenne Sawchuk Mackenzie Mihorean Leslie Kelley Enna Sue	6:34.434

=== 2022 ===
Event			Gold		Silver		Bronze
Men	M1x	University of British Columbia Liam Smit	6:40.560	University of Victoria Patrick Keane	6:45.410	Brock University Michael Ciepiela	6:48.690
Men	LM1x	University of Victoria Patrick Keane	6:44.770	University of British Columbia Emerson Crick	6:49.660	University of Montreal Matthieu Beaud	6:56.950
Men	LM2x	Brock University Stephen Harris Thomas Markewich	6:15.900	University of British Columbia Christian Place Nicolas Schramm	6:19.100	University of Victoria GianCarlo DiPompeo Matthew Thompson	6:24.200
Men	M2-	University of British Columbia Julian Black Joel Cullen	6:22.600	Queen's University Kyle Nummi Robert Bryden	6:26.680	University of Victoria Liam Hodgins William Simpson	6:28.630
Men	LM4+	Brock University Thomas Markewich Stephen Harris Connor Dodds Jonathan Cinquina Riley Pisek	6:08.500	University of British Columbia Emerson Crick Johnathan McLeod Nicolas Schramm Christian Place Clare Cunningham	6:11.300	University of Victoria Matthew Thompson Adam Miller Giancarlo DiPompeo Patrick Keane Helen Ross	6:15.800
Men	M8+	University of British Columbia Joel Cullen Julian Black Aidan Della Siega Axel Ewashko Liam Smit Brendan Wall Quinn Storey Julien Wiese Isabelle Barlow-Jeffrey	5:25.230	University of Victoria Joseph Peers Kai Bartel Liam Hodgins Jesse Harold Connor Attridge Anthony Carella Spencer Lewis William Simpson Nicholas Murray-Coplen	5:37.120	Brock University Stephen Harris Thomas Markewich Sam Stewart Michael Ciepiela Daniel Brophy Connor Dodds Chris Gomez Jared Boles Riley Pisek	5:39.980
Women	W1x	University of MontrealAlizée Brien	7:16.680	Trent University Grace VandenBroek	7:18.240	University of Western Ontario Elisa Bolinger	7:28.060
Women	LW1x	University of Western Ontario Karissa Riley	7:33.500	University of Ottawa Kennedy Burrows	7:34.200	University of Toronto Sophie Corradini	7:38.400
Women	LW2x	University of Victoria Paige Letham Genevieve Olsen	7:01.850	Brock University Zoe Durcak Isabella Durcak	7:02.400	University of British Columbia Mary Law Meghan Camplin	7:03.700
Women	W2-	University of British Columbia Caitlin Lawrence Julia Tancon	7:01.830	University of Western Ontario Rachel Weber Elisa Bolinger	7:02.370	University of Victoria Margaret Hemphill Abby Speirs	7:04.480
Women	LW4+	University of Western Ontario Karissa Riley Sara Butler Hayley Conrad Kaitlyn Hall Enna Sue	6:57.130	University of Victoria Paige Letham Sophia Regosa Genevieve Olsen Sai Sai (Charise) Faubert Zoe Crookshank	6:58.050	Queen's University Emily Pain Lauren Matai Claire MacDougall Brigitte Gaudert Sara Stephenson	7:03.010
Women	W8+	University of Victoria Danae McCulloch Margaret Hemphill Abby Speirs Nicole Cusack Mikaela Holthuis Danica Ariano Kaliya Javra Noa Hardcastle Sofie Hof	6:12.270	Queen's University Claire Ellison Lauren Matai Shaye de Paiva Jacquie Groenewegen Emily Pain Ceilidh MacDonald Gillian Jansen Isabelle Ngo Aliki Karanikas	6:16.690	University of British Columbia Ellie Sousa Sally Jones Caitlin Lawrence Laura Stankiewicz Gabriella Worobec Nicole Gammie Jackie Blunt Julia Tancon Alex Birkenshaw	6:17.600

=== 2021 ===
Event			Gold		Silver		Bronze
Men	M1x	University of British Columbia Liam Smit	7:04.271	Queen's University Gavin Stone	7:08.027	McGill University Terek Been	7:09.576
Men	LM1x	University of Victoria Patrick Keane	7:18.143	Queen's University Andrew Hubbard	7:23.619	Western University Jeremy Langelaan	7:30.540
Men	LM2x	University of Victoria GianCarlo DiPompeo Matthew Thompson	6:43.200	Brock University Thomas Markewich Stephen Harris	6:43.900	University of British Columbia Nicholas Schramm Emerson Crick	6:48.700
Men	M2-	University of British Columbia Julian Black Joel Cullen	6:48.657	Queen's University Basil Jancso-Szabo Robert Bryden	6:53.051	Western University Matthew Pamenter Aidan Hembruff	6:53.764
Men	LM4+	University of Victoria Matthew Thompson Jordan MacDougall Patrick Keane Giancarlo DiPompeo Riley Raso	6:30.918	Brock University Thomas Markewich Stephen Harris Jonathan Cinquina Jared Boles Riley Pisek	6:33.047	Western University Alexander Brandt Zack Masciangelo Jeremy Langelaan David Johnson Georgia Greenwood	6:36.439
Men	M8+	University of British Columbia Clarke Schultz Julian Black Axel Ewashko Joshua Kemper Joel Cullen Quinn Storey Liam Smit Quinten Schmidt Patricia Ye	5:45.777	University of Victoria Alec Stapff Liam Hodgins Connor Attridge Steven Randall Jacob Phillips Haydn Thomas Mitchell Rodgers Patrick Keane Nicholas Murray-Coplen	5:48.717	Queen's University Lucas Celia Andrew Hubbard Basil Jancso-Szabo Gavin Stone Kyle Nummi Lucas Austin Alex Abicht Robert Bryden Megan Stellato	5:52.543
Women	LW1x	University of British Columbia Renee LaFreniere	8:00.21	University of Victoria Hannah Meeson	8:03.733	Laurentian University Abbey Maillet	8:15.782
Women	W1x	University of Victoria Piper Battersby	7:54.123	University of British Columbia Katie Clark	7:57.655	Trent University Grace VandenBroek	7:58.392
Women	LW2x	Western University Karissa Riley Alex Freeman	7:21.080	University of British Columbia Mary Law Ehren Paterson	7:25.210	Queen's University Bianca Hill Danica Vangsgaard	7:28.680
Women	W2-	University of Victoria Kirsten Edwards Alexis Cronk	7:36.939	University of British Columbia Jessica Sevick Claire Brillon	7:44.893	Western University Jacqueline Blunt Rachel Weber	7:50.691
Women	LW4+	Western University Karissa Riley Sara Butler Cheyenne Sawchuck Alex Freeman Mallory Orr	7:12.800	Queen's University Jiaxi Lu Jessica Stephenson Isabelle Ngo Gillian Jansen Aliki Karanikas	7:14.918	University of British Columbia Renee Lafreniere Ehren Paterson Meghan Camplin Mary Law Victoria Schuster	7:18.344
Women	W8+	University of British Columbia Sally Jones Ellie Sousa Jessica Sevick Katie Clark Laura Stankiewicz Claire Brillon Julia Tancon Anna Freeman Alexandra Birkenshaw	6:21.159	University of Victoria Piper Battersby Eliza-Jane Kitchen Kirsten Edwards Alexis Cronk Margaret Hemphill Danae McCulloch Noa Hardcastle Adriana Rooker Helen Ross	6:21.765	Queen's University Bianca Hill Claire Ellison Danica Vangsgaard Lauren Matai Jiaxi Lu Jessica Stephenson Isabelle Ngo Gillian Jansen Jay Hyuk Cho	6:38.811

=== 2019 ===
Event			Gold		Silver		Bronze
Men	M1x	University of British Columbia Karl Zimmerman	6:52.29	Queen's University Michael Bryenton	6:53.28	Trent University Spencer Kielar	6:57.00
Men	LM1x	Brock University Thomas Markewich	7:04.10	Queen's University Evan Notley	7:11.00	University of Victoria Benjamin Walls	7:13.98
Men	LM2x	Brock University Thomas Markewich Stephen Harris	6:24.63	Western University Patrick Gogan Connor Newell	6:25.99	University of British Columbia Ivan Rybkin Ethan Enns	6:35.30
Men	M2-	Western University Curtis Ames Ryan Clegg	6:33.77	University of British Columbia Clark Schultz Brendan Wall	6.36.75	University of Victoria Alec Stapff Travis Gronsdahl	6:39.49
Men	LM4+	Western University Patrick Gogan Connor Newell Alexander Brandt Daniel Sullivan James Doyle	6:21.28	University of British Columbia Ivan Rybkin Hugh Graham Ethan Enns Maxwell Nadeau Isabelle Barlow	6:22.77	Brock University Owen Voelkner Jacob Martens Stephen Harris Kevin Keith Brooke Kew	6:29.53
Men	M8+	University of British Columbia Ryan Beach Clarke Schultz Sean van Gessel Karl Zimmerman Quinten Schmidt Thomas Lynch Brendan Wall David Ross Patricia Ye	5:31.39	Western University Curtis Ames Ryan Clegg Braden Reid Matthew Pamenter Sam Carmel Aelon Nicolson Kyle Pollock Ben Kozak James Doyle	5:33.61	University of Victoria Alec Stapff Travis Gronsdahl Tyler Adams Jacob Phillips Joshua Novak William Simpson Joseph Peers Alexander Sawers Riley Raso	5:39.48
Women	LW1x	University of British Columbia Julia Lindsay	8:00.35	University of Victoria Aida Lissel-DeCorby	8:07.37	Western University Riley Knight	8:09.33
Women	W1x	University of British Columbia Katie Clark	7:31.07	University of Victoria Layla Balooch	7:34.73	Laurentian University Hayley Chase	7:39.08
Women	LW2x	University of British Columbia Renee LaFreniere Emma Starr	7:12.23	Queen's University Danica Vangsgaard Greta Chase	7:15.95	University of Victoria Victoria Gilbert Eden Hardcastle	7:27.01
Women	W2-	University of Victoria McKenna Simpson Piper Battersby	7:17.94	Queen's University Paige Adams Claire Ellison	7:23.19	Western University Cassidy Deane Elisa Bollinger	7:30.64
Women	LW4+	University of British Columbia Grace Hardwicke-Brown Emma Starr Julia Lindsay Renee LaFreniere Victoria Schuster	6:58.08	University of Victoria Eden Hardcastle Victoria Gilbert Aida Lissel-DeCorby Hannah Meeson Olivia Zachariah	7:00.35	Western University Jennifer Aswald Riley Knight Tianna McElligott Sabrina Morris Erin Alizadeh	7:14.61
Women	W8+	Western University Yara Ensminger Kyra Urabe Kyleigh Arthur Ivana Perkucin Cassidy Deane Elisa Bolinger Amandine Drew Leslie Kelley Erin Alizadeh	6:18.65	University of Victoria McKenna Simpson Piper Battersby Kirsten Edwards Layla Balooch Alexis Cronk Adriana Rooker Tess Mackay-Pettyjohn Danae McCulloch Olivia Zachariah	6:18.99	University of British Columbia Caitlin Greber Lucy Vincent-Smith Michelle Wesolowski Claire Armstrong Paula Cameron Katie Clark Caitlin Lawrence Michaela Ashlee Alex Birkenshaw	6:19.56

=== 2018 ===
Event			Gold		Silver		Bronze
Men	M1x	Queen's University Gavin Stone	7:17.370	Laurentian University Charles Alexander	7:23.800	University of Victoria Lucien Brodeur	7:29.110
Men	LM1x	Trent University Spencer Kielar	7:29.200	Queen's University Alex Bernst	7:36.480	University of British Columbia Ivan Rybkin	7:39.130
Men	LM2x	Queen's University Nicholas Grubic Alex Bernst	6:51.230	Trent University Dayton Kelly Spencer Kielar	6:53.090	Brock University Jacob Giesbrecht Jacob Martens	6:54.000
Men	M2-	Western University Curtis Ames Ryan Clegg	7:00.370	University of British Columbia Clarke Schultz Brendan Wall	7:04.600	University of Victoria Eric Arscott Travis Gronsdahl	7:08.730
Men	LM4+	Queen's University Nicholas Grubic Alex Bernst Evan Notley Daniel Stret Michael Wightman	6:48.740	University of British Columbia Sawyer Precious Ivan Rybkin Maxwell Nadeau Ethan Enns Patricia Ye	6:50.410	Brock University Jacob Giesbrecht Jacob Martens Owen Voelkner Zachary Whiteley Raymond Wong	6:51.960
Men	M8+	University of British Columbia Ryan Beach Brendan Wall Clark Schultz Michael Anderson Daan Vos de Wael Liam Marcil Sean van Gessel Ries Meijssen Kevin Chung	6:14.020	University of Victoria Eric Arscott Travis Gronsdahl Alexander Sawers Tyler Adams Brett Larson Alec Stapff Lucien Brodeur Mathew Szymanowski Skylar Presch	6:17.820	Western University Aelon Nicolson Curtis Ames Ryan Clegg Matthew Pamenter Benjamin Kozak Edward Paul Davenport Keifer Stevenson Sam Carmel Emily Lawrence	6:17.890
Women	LW1x	University of British Columbia Julia Lindsay	8:19.250	University of Guelph Carly Zanatta	8:21.810	Queen's University Katherine Walker	8:28.470
Women	W1x	Queen's University Louise Munro	7:53.660	University of Victoria Layla Balooch	7:56.720	Trent University Grace VandenBroek	7:59.690
Women	LW2x	University of Guelph Carly Zanatta Kaitlyn Dennis	7:35.640	University of British Columbia Renee LaFreniere Emma Starr	7:37.370	Western University Kyra Urabe Emily Soares	7:37.450
Women	W2-	University of Victoria McKenna Simpson Piper Battersby	7:37.420	University of British Columbia Paula Cameron Claire Brillon	7:41.350	Queen's University Paige Adams Cassidy Deane	7:43.320
Women	LW4+	University of British Columbia Renee LaFreniere Julia Lindsay Emma Starr Paige Reinhard Alex Birkenshaw	7:34.430	University of Victoria Sarah Craven Hannah Meeson Hayley Hubbs Eden Hardcastle Lily Copeland	7:38.200	University of Guelph Claire Benwood Emma De Wit Carly Zanatta Kaitlyn Dennis Genevieve DesOrmeaux	7:39.270
Women	W8+	University of British Columbia Paula Cameron Lucy Vincent-Smith Caitlin Greber Claire Armstrong Katie Clark Jessica Sevick Kristina Walker Claire Brillon Alex Birkenshaw	6:39.480	University of Victoria McKenna Simpson Kirsten Edwards Larissa Mckinlay Layla Balooch Elissa McCracken Danae McCulloch Gillian Cattet Piper Battersby Olivia Zachariah	6:41.550	Brock University Anna Malony Isabella Mazzarolo Alyssa Toffolo Amanda Martin Brianna Spanics Sabrina Tigwell Jenna Osborne Kayla Krasnor Laura Court	6:55.340

=== 2017 ===
Event			Gold		Silver		Bronze
Men	M1x	Trent University Trevor Jones	7:17.210	Brock University Matthew Finley	7:20.530	Queen's University Gavin Stone	7:21.040
Men	LM1x	University of Victoria Patrick Keane	7:23.866	University of British Columbia Aaron Lattimer	7:27.650	University of Ottawa Alexander Kunkel	7:36.302
Men	LM2x	University of British Columbia Maxwell Lattimer Aaron Lattimer	6:53.198	Queen's University Nick Grubic Alex Bernst	6:56.526	University of Victoria Sebastian Gulka Christian Gulka	7:06.154
Men	M2-	University of Victoria Mathew Szymanowski Taylor Perry	6:58.317	Western University Brayden Halvorson Curtis Ames	6:58.485	Trent University Trevor Jones Daniel Bullock	7:02.596
Men	LM4+	University of British Columbia Ivan Rybkin Marcus Vandersande Maxwell Lattimer Aaron Lattimer Kevin Chung	6:39.459	University of Victoria Sebastian Gulka Christian Gulka Sam Garber Patrick Keane Bailey Kulman	6:46.691	Western University Connor Newell Alexander Brandt Patrick Gogan Reid Vassallo Melissa Webb-Wilkinson	6:50.471
Men	M8+	University of British Columbia Harris Sheldon Marcus Van der sande Patrick Heaney Sean van Gessel Raymond Bell Matthew Schultz Brendan Wall Ryan Beach Kevin Chung	6:02.192	University of Victoria Adam Donaldson Lucien Brodeur Mathew Szymanowski Brett Larson Tyler Adams Eric Arscott Mark Davies Taylor Perry Skylar Presch	6:05.038	Brock University Jacob Martens Taylor Ashwood Alex Roger Ryan Malcowski Zachary Koroll Ian Pierce Nicholas Heffernan Matthew Finley Mackenzie Boyes	6:11.664
Women	LW1x	Western University Larissa Werbicki	8:22.369	University of Guelph Carly Zanatta	8:29.729	University of British Columbia Julia Lindsay	8:38.889
Women	W1x	University of Victoria Caileigh Filmer	8:07.185	Queen's University Louise Munro	8:20.457	University of British Columbia Rachel Vukovich	8:30.637
Women	LW2x	Western University Riley Knight Larissa Werbicki	7:38.291	University of Guelph Kaitlyn Dennis Carly Zanatta	7:42.959	University of British Columbia Renee LaFreniere Emma Starr	7:44.915
Women	W2-	University of Victoria Olivia King Morgan Cathrea	7:40.270	University of British Columbia Savannah Sami-Bacon Jessica Sevick	7:50.170	Western University Karen Lefsrud Marilyse Dubois	8:04.950
Women	LW4+	Western University Riley Knight Emily Soares Emily Boehmer Larissa Werbicki Amber Low	7:43.103	University of British Columbia Emma Starr Julia Lindsay Isabella Cina Renee LaFreniere Alex Birkenshaw	7:45.665	University of Victoria Rebecca Kingston Rachel Kalkman Sarah Craven Alanna Ward Jessica Bateman	8:00.589
Women	W8+	University of Victoria McKenna Simpson Larissa McKinlay Jessica Stewart Maxine Chapman Avalon Wasteneys Morgan Cathrea Olivia King Caileigh Filmer Cassidy Fernandes	6:39.094	University of British Columbia Claire Brillon Kristina Walker Claire Armstrong Jessica Sevick Lucy Vincent-Smith Savannah Sami-Bacon Emily Gerson Rachel Vukovich Tina Yu	6:46.182	Western University Ivana Perkucin Amandine Drew Lauren Gadsdon Nicole Baranowski Karen Lefsrud Marilyse Dubois D'Arcy Arends Yara Ensminger Amber Low	6:54.150

=== 2016 ===
Event			Gold		Silver		Bronze
Men	M1x	Trent University Trevor Jones	7:21.789	University of Victoria Taylor Perry	7:24.034	Brock University Matthew Finley	7:29.254
Men	LM1x	Trent University Alex Watson	7:20.298	University of British Columbia Aaron Lattimer	7:23.373	Brock University Taylor Ashwood	7:24.397
Men	LM2x	University of British Columbia Maxwell Lattimer Aaron Lattimer	7:08.199	University of Toronto Andrei Vovk Jacob Giesbrecht	7:10.329	Brock University Taylor Ashwood Owen Volkener	7:12.226
Men	M2-	Trent University Graham Peeters Andrew Stewart-Jones	7:24.839	Western University Brayden Halvorson Aaron Kirkey	7:27.910	McMaster University Logan Madil Karl Wimmerman	7:28.089
Men	LM4+	University of British Columbia Ivan Rybkin Mark Bonar Maxwell Lattimer Aaron Lattimer Justin Dohm	6:46.209	Western University Jack Summerhayes Jonathan Blazevic Andrew Johnston Reid Vassallo Ali Zimmerman	6:48.238	Queen's University Nicholas Grubic Mitchel Valic Karol Stanski Alex Bernst Michael Wightman	6:51.996
Men	M8+	University of Victoria Lucien Brodeur Brett Larson Travis Gronsdahl Eric Daan Arscott Mathew Szymanowski Taylor Perry Mark Davies Adam Donaldson Kulman Bailey	5:59.731	University of British Columbia Maxwell Lattimer Stef Cvoric Ray Bell Dave Marchioro Eben Prevec Ryan Beach Harris Sheldon Ben Coull Kevin Chung	6:00.592	Trent University Alex Watson Dyton Kelly Matt Seaby Graham Peeters Mark Moyer Trevor Jones James Dyer Andrew Stewart-Jones Abby Adaire	6:07.498
Women	LW1x	University of British Columbia Julia Lindsay	8:55.390	Western University Jill Moffatt	8:55.848	University of Guelph Carly Zanatta	9:00.769
Women	W1x	Western University Jill Moffatt	8:35.197	University of Guelph Carly Zanatta	8:36.197	University of British Columbia Rachel Vukovich	8:41.649
Women	LW2x	Western University Larissa Werbicki Heather Noble	7:42.466	University of Victoria Rebecca Kingston Jessica Bateman-Wallace	7:49.686	Brock University Alison Whitty Kayla Krasnor	7:52.538
Women	W2-	University of British Columbia Hillary Janssens Emily Gerson	7:39.371	Western University Karen Lefsrud Marika Kay	7:42.487	Queen's University Cassidy Deane Louise Munro	7:49.482
Women	LW4+	Western University Heather Noble Jill Moffatt Emily Garry Larissa Werbicki Staphanie Moore	7:32.504	University of British Columbia Julia Lindsay Shona Taylor Isabella Cina Leah Taylor Gillian Der	7:49.190	University of Toronto Jasmine Carter Nicola Plummer Rachel Dick Megan Lewicki Jessie MacAlpine	7:51.642
Women	W8+	University of British Columbia Anna Black Kristina Walker Rebecca Marino Miranda Kirker Savannah Sami-Bacon Emily Gerson Hillary Janssens Rachel Vukovich Emmie Page	6:53.419	University of Victoria Avalon Wasteneys Cat Slamka Kirsten McKay Larissa McKinlay Erin Moen Roza Kalashnikoff McLenna Simpson Rebecca Zimmerman Becky Wilder	6:58.175	Western University Esma Mrkaljevic Yara Ensminger Payton Dearing Marilyse Dubois Karen Lefsrud Amandine Drew Beth McConnell Marika Kay Mel Webb-Wilkinson	6:59.398

=== 2015 ===
Event			Gold		Silver		Bronze
Men	M1x	McMaster University	7:05.95	Trent University	7:09.81	Western University	7:11.09
Men	LM1x	Western University	7:13.00	University of British Columbia	7:15.66	Trent University	7:15.95
Men	LM2x	University of Victoria	6:37.95	Trent University	6:40.87	Brock University	6:49.04
Men	M2-	Brock University	6:51.85	Western University	6.56.68	University of Victoria	7:00.76
Men	LM4+	Western University	6:26.11	University of British Columbia	6:27.95	Brock University	6:31.25
Men	M8+	Brock University	5:50.39	Western University	5:52.89	University of British Columbia	5:53.82
Women	LW1x	Western University	8:12.14	University of Victoria	8:15.91	University of Ottawa	8:16.75
Women	W1x	University of Victoria	7:51.98	Queen's University	7:56.61	Brock University	7:58.73
Women	LW2x	Western University	7:20.00	University of Victoria	7:32.92	University of Ottawa	7:41.20
Women	W2-	University of British Columbia	7:30.38	Brock University	7:34.05	University of Victoria	7:42.37
Women	LW4+	Western University	7:14.57	University of Victoria	7:23.38	University of British Columbia	7:27.34
Women	W8+	University of British Columbia	6:29.75	Western University	6:35.72	University of Victoria	6:39.31

=== 2014 ===
Event			Gold		Silver		Bronze
Men	M1x	University of British Columbia	7:43.68	Trent University	7:44.65	McMaster University	7:45.48
Men	LM1x	Carleton University	7:10.90	McGill University	7:18.69	University of British Columbia	7:20.53
Men	LM2x	University of Victoria	6:44.82	University of British Columbia	6:52.22	Trent University	6:55.45
Men	M2-	Western University	7:05.78	Brock University	7:09.14	University of Victoria	7:11.63
Men	LM4+	University of British Columbia	6:28.29	Brock University	6:29.23	University of Victoria	6:36.11
Men	M8+	University of Victoria	5:39.73	Brock University	5:41.33	University of British Columbia	5:42.12
Women	LW1x	Western University	8:38.00	University of Ottawa	8:47.13	University of British Columbia	8:48.18
Women	W1x	Trent University	8:29.94	University of Ottawa	8:33.32	University of Toronto	8:34.68
Women	LW2x	Western University	7:32.12	University of Victoria	7:35.43	University of British Columbia	7:50.72
Women	W2-	University of British Columbia	7:35.39	University of Victoria	7:36.59	Western University	7:38.19
Women	LW4+	Western University	7:07.44	University of Victoria	7:13.66	Queen's University	7:29.29
Women	W8+	University of British Columbia	6:38.62	Western University	6:40.53	University of Victoria	6:43.47

=== 2013 ===
Event			Gold		Silver		Bronze
Men	M1x	University of Manitoba Kevin Kowalyk	8:37.80	Western University Adam Rabalski	8:40.31	University of Ottawa Josh Weissbock	8:43.20
Men	LM1x	Carleton University Matthew Fournier	8:23.25	University of British Columbia Maxwell Lattimer	8:25.90	University of Alberta Ole Tietz	8:33.53
Men	LM2x	University of Victoria Alex Walker Lee Tate-Hall	7:24.82	Brock University James Myers Grayson Gray	7:25.22	University of British Columbia Aaron Lattimer Angus Todd	7:29.76
Men	M2-	University of Victoria Sean Decter William O'Connell	7:44.24	Western University Alexander Munro Marc Addison	7:52.48	Brock University David de Groot Matthew Finley	7:52.92
Men	LM4+	University of British Columbia Aaron Lattimer Maxwell Lattimer Evan Cheng Angus Todd Mark Goudie	7:14.38	Western University Kieran Tierney Derek Stedman Brent Duncan Jack Summerhayes Laura Maclachlan	7:15.62	Queen's University Chris Zakos Alan Payno-Montoya Pat McCrady Jordan Rendall Greg Wilson	7:17.07
Men	M8+	Western University Marc Addison Aaron Kirkey Adam Rabalski Jerome Van Leeuwen Patrick Shulist Lance Brazeau André Pelletier Alexander Munro Laura Maclachlan	6:23.98	University of British Columbia Benjamin Coull Robert Gage Evan Cheng Eben Prevec Alexander Janzen Douglas Euper Brock Euper Maxwell Lattimer Mark Goudie	6:28.06	Brock University John White Matthew Finley Tim Schrijver Michael Kessler Mark Alm David de Groot James Myers Grayson Gray Amy McLean	6:32.13
Women	LW1x	Western University Jaclyn Halko	9:08.37	Brock University Katherine Walker	9:17.79	University of Victoria Renae Barks	9:22.19
Women	W1x	Laurentian University Carling Zeeman	8:46.21	Queen's University Larkin Davenport-Huyer	9:07.95	Western University Genevieve Favreau	9:08.88
Women	LW2x	Western University Jill Moffatt Sara Matovic	8:57.22	University of British Columbia Julie Sheppard Martha Smith	8:59.55	University of Victoria Renae Barks Emily Garry	9:00.63
Women	W2-	University of British Columbia Hillary Janssens Lauren Wilkinson	8:29.45	University of Victoria Rebecca Zimmerman Jillian Legare	8:33.75	Queen's University Isolda Penney Meghan Robinson	8:36.44
Women	LW4+	Western University Jaclyn Halko Sara Matovic Alyssa Ethier Jill Moffatt Mackenzie Boyes	8:09.10	University of Victoria Cate White Kiersten Van Gulick Emily Garry Renae Barks Becky Wilder	8:20.90	Queen's University Emily Baturin Anisa Truman Kelsey Hayes Danielle Abusow Shelby Stinnissen	8:25.2
Women	W8+	University of British Columbia Katherine Enns Amelie Schumacher Lauren Wilkinson Hillary Janssens Emily Gerson Rachel Vukovich Julie Sheppard Teena Schneider Molly Lai	7:23.22	Queen's University Elizabeth Price Isolda Penney Meghan Robinson Michelle Truax Chloe DesRoche Laura Stanley Lexis Ross Larkin Davenport-Huyer Sean Whitehall	7:24.38	Western University Sydney Boyes Kathleen Morrison Jessie Loutit Lenore Chesworth Addie Barr Kaelan Chambers Genevieve Favreau Chaundra Manorome Natasha Caminsky	7:27.27

=== 2012 ===
Event			Gold		Silver		Bronze
Men	M1x	Western University Adam Rabalski	7:24.80	Guelph University Mark Henry	7:27.76	Brock University Fraser Berkhout	7:31.55
Men	LM1x	University of Alberta Ole Teitz	7:16.01	Guelph University Mark Henry	7:18.07	University of British Columbia Valentin Dunsing	7:21.28
Men	LM2x	University of Victoria Lee Tate-Hall Alexander Walker	6:49.93	Brock University Russell McKean James Myers	6:56.09	University of British Columbia Evan Cheng Angus Todd	6:59.94
Men	M2-	Brock University Mark Alm Tim Schrijver	6:54.90	University of Victoria Connor McGuigan William O'Connell	6:59.23	Western University Mark Dawidek David Lariviere	7:00.93
Men	LM4+	Queen's University Matthew Christie Patrick McCrady Jordan Rendall Christopher Zakos Jacob Koudys	6:24.62	University of Victoria Brendan Downey Jon Chandler Alex Walker Lee Tate-Hall Alexandra Clancy	6:27.26	Brock University Ben Cushnie Brendan Coffey Sylas Coletto Cory Machesney Kate Dirks	6:28.62
Men	M8+	Western University Graham Schenck Alexander Munro Gianrico DePasquale Adam Rabalski Lance Brazeau Nicholas Schudlo Mark Dawidek David Lariviere Meghan Erskine	5:45.74	Brock University Mark Alm Ben Cushnie David de Groot Gregory Theriault Matthew Wortley Tim Schrijver Edward Vaughan Fraser Berkhout Ashley Niblett	5:48.14	University of Victoria Christopher Marshall Connor McGuigan Anthony Linton Sean Decter Curtis Champion Gareth Lindstrom William O'Connell Sean Carnduff Jane Gumley	5:49.08
Women	LW1x	University of British Columbia Katherine Enns	8:16.79	University of Toronto Katherine Sauks	8:24.87	University of Victoria Emily Garry	8:29.66
Women	W1x	Laurentian University Carling Zeeman	8:08.48	Western University Genevieve Favreau	8:25.92	University of Victoria Alyssa Weninger	8:30.69
Women	LW2x	University of Victoria Stefanie Miklosovic Rachel Dennis	7:47.54	University of British Columbia Chloe O'Neil Katherine Enns	7:50.88	Western University Sarah Christensen Alyssa Ethier	7:58.06
Women	W2-	McGill University Kalyna Franko Luce Bourbeau	7:48.15	Western University Jody Schuurman Adelyn Barr	7:51.34	University of British Columbia Teena Schneider Zoe Fettig-Winn	7:54.66
Women	LW4+	Western University Melissa Faichuk Sarah Christensen Alyssa Ethier Sara Matovic Natasha Caminsky	7:22.29	University of British Columbia Chloe O'neil Martha Smith Jannelle Mackoff Julie Sheppard Krisha Lim	7:26.30	Queen's University Anise Truman Kelsey Hayes Jennifer Johnston Lindsey Wilson Florence Hogg	7:28.77
Women	W8+	Western University Andrea Ernesaks Jennifer Martins Sarah Black Jody Schuurman Genevieve Favreau Chaundra Manorome Claudia Blandford Vanessa Beland Natasha Caminsky	6:31.13	University of Victoria Bronwyn Lawrie Renae Barks Marla Catherall Lara Kemp Jillian Legare Alyssa Weninger Claire McCormick Meaghan Thorkelson Megan Smith	6:40.03	University of British Columbia Martha Smith Jannelle Mackoff Jocelyn plant Lia Hart Amelie Schumacher Zoe Fetting-Winn Teena Schneider Julie Sheppard Molly Lai	6:44.77

=== 2011 ===
Event			Gold		Silver		Bronze
Men	M1x	University of Victoria Joshua Morris	7:14.36	University of Western Ontario Adam Rabalski	7:16.11	University of Alberta Ole Teitz	7:18.56
Men	LM1x	Queen's University Matthew Christie	7:16.01	University of Western Ontario Derek Stedman	7:18.07	University of Ottawa Andrew Todd	7:21.28
Men	LM2x	University of Western Ontario Derek Stedman Caleb McCleary	6:48.76	University of Ottawa Andrew Todd	6:52.64	Guelph University Tyler Wilson Mark Henry	6:47.50
Men	M2-	Brock University Michael Lewis Edward Vaughan	6:54.28	University of British Columbia Robert Gage Ben de Wit	6:59.23	University of Western Ontario Michael Huurman David Lariviere	7:00.93
Men	LM4+	University of Western Ontario Graham Schenck Brent Duncan Maxwell Lattimer Marc Addison Dane Lawson	6:24.62	University of Victoria Brendan Downey Jon Chandler Connor McSweeney Cameron York Jane Gumley	6:27.26	Brock University Ben Cushnie Brendan Coffey Sylas Coletto Cory Machesney Kate Dirks	6:28.62
Men	M8+	Brock University Ben Cushnie Tim Schrijver Keegan Drummond Edward Vaughan Matthew Wortley Michael Lewis Ian MacLeod Mark Alm Alexsia Dekaneas	5:42.25	University of Western Ontario Michael Huurman Mark Dawidek David Lariviere Nicholas Schudlo Adam Rabalski Danny Matthews Graham Schenck Marc Addison Dane Lawson	5:43.04	University of Victoria Kai Langerfeld Anthony Linton Joshua Morris Ross Bringgold Will O'Connell Gareth Lindstrom Jon Chandler Brendan Downey Jane Gumley	5:44.00
Women	LW1x	University of Victoria Ingrid Braul	8:10.95	Guelph University Kerith Gordon	8:18.331	Brock University Elizabeth Euiler	8:22.62
Women	W1x	Laurentian University Carling Zeeman	7:49.77	University of Ottawa Katherine Goodfellow	8:01.85	University of Victoria Antje von Seydlitz	8:08.61
Women	LW2x	University of Victoria Leanne Fells Alexandra Meiklejohn	7:56.21	University of Western Ontario Sarah Matovic Katie O'Connor	8:06.77	Queen's University Erin Snelgrove Emily Richardson	8:10.46
Women	W2-	University of Western Ontario Sarah Black Jennifer Martins	7:51.75	Brock University Jennifer Vandermaarel Brittney Ellis	7:56.78	Queen's University Meghan Robinson Cayley Firth	8:00.31
Women	LW4+	University of Victoria Stefanie Miklosovic Ingrid Braul Leanne Fells Alexandra Meiklejohn Cay-lee Honey	7:13.04	University of Western Ontario Katie O'Connor Sara Matovic Beth Farnell Melissa Faichuk Emily Hirst	7:42.92	Queen's University Emily Richardson Lindsey Wilson Bekah Brown Florence Hogg Amelia Wilkinson	7:45.14
Women	W8+	University of Western Ontario Andrea Ernesaks Jennifer Martins Sarah Black Jody Schuurman Genevieve Favreau Chaundra Manorome Claudia Blandford Vanessa Beland Natasha Caminsky	6:31.13	University of Victoria Claire McCormick Ruby Walser Teresa Berkholtz Alyssa Weninger Lara Kemp Antje Von Seydlitz Erika Shaw Kayla Smith Anna Braunizer	6:33.57	Queen's University Sean Whitehall Cayley Firth Meghan Robinson Elise Hofmann Kaitlyn McSorley Chelsea Wisheart Talia Wright Jessica Metuzals Laura Fraser	6:38.11

=== 2010 ===
Event			Gold		Silver		Bronze
Men	M1x	Guelph University Adam Rabalski	7:38.37	University of Victoria William O'Connell	7:40.97	University of British Columbia Brooke Biscoe	7:46.72
Men	LM1x	University of Victoria Kevin Mitchell	7:33.21	Guelph University Mark Henry	7:38.84	Queen's University Robert Ballard	7:42.59
Men	LM2x	University of British Columbia Dan Guest Maksym Kepskyy	6:40.94	University of Victoria Brendan Downey Niall Paltiel	6:43.63	Trent University Tyler Wilson Michael Veltri	6:47.50
Men	M2-	University of Victoria Kai Langerfeld Richard Herlinveaux	6:55.07	University of Western Ontario Michael Huurman David Lariviere	6:57.51	University of British Columbia Andrew Knorr Robert Gage	7:06.32
Men	LM4+	Brock University Sylas Coletto Cory Machesney Dylan Coffey Ben Cushnie Alexsia Dekaneas	6:40.94	University of Victoria Niall Paltiel Brendan Downey Jon Chandler Kevin Mitchell Jane Gumley	6:45.06	University of Western Ontario Graham Schenck Marc Addison Kevin Luzak Derek Stedman Dane Lawson	6:53.91
Men	M8+	University of Victoria Richard Herlineaux William Odhams Eric Bevan Ross Bringgold Anthony Linton Kai Langerfeld William O'Connell Peter Brooks Jane Gumley	5:54.14	Brock University Sylas Coletto Keegan Drummond Mark Alm Josh Gracin Travis King Michael Lewis Dylan Coffey Ben Cushnie Alexsia Dekaneas	5:57.08	University of Western Ontario Michael Huurman David Lariviere Mark Dawidek Nicholas Schudlo Marc Addison Nick Chisholm Ian Gauld Jared Schachter Dane Lawson	5:59.07
Women	LW1x	University of Victoria Ingrid Braul	8:10.63	University of British Columbia Andrea Bundon	8:12.90	Queen's University Catherine Moores	8:13.61
Women	W1x	University of Ottawa Katherine Goodfellow	7:49.22	University of British Columbia Lindsay Sferrazza	7:50.28	University of Victoria Renae Barks	7:53.25
Women	LW2x	University of Victoria Leanne Fells Alexandra Meiklejohn	7:56.21	University of British Columbia Chloe O'Neil Andrea Bundon	8:06.77	Queen's University Catherine Moores Caylen Heckel	8:10.46
Women	W2-	University of Western Ontario Sarah Black Jennifer Martins	7:51.75	University of Calgary Jessie Loutit Brittney Szwarc	7:56.78	University of Toronto Claire Hutchinson Elise Mackie	8:00.31
Women	LW4+	University of Victoria Renae Barks Leanne Fells Ingrid Braul Alexandra Meiklejohn Katie Krauter	7:34.92	Queen's University Kyle McCasey Catherine Moores Emily Richardson Caylen Heckel Sean Whitehall	7:42.92	Brock University Jenna Burke Beth Nelson Keelin Greenlaw Kate Nay Nikki Morrison	7:45.14
Women	W8+	University of Western Ontario Sarah Black Lindsay Sferrazza Andrea Ernesaks Jennifer Martins Adelyn Barr Athena deBrouwer Mimmi Thompson Genevieve Favreau Paige Sain	6:48.2	Brock University Keelin Greenlaw Jenna Burke Shawn Bright Kate Nay Cayley Firth Stephanie Mowder Megan Tucker Britt Ellis Nikki Morrison	6:56.73	University of Victoria Stephanie Miklosovic Lauren McLennan Claire McCormick Elise McCormick Lara Kemp Kasia Gwiazda Danielle Olmstead Alexandra Marchuk Katie Krautner	6:58.82

=== 2009 ===
Event			Gold		Silver		Bronze
Men	M1x	University of Toronto	7:38.8	Trent University	7:52.6	Queen's University	7:56.2
Men	LM1x	University of British Columbia	7:46.3	Brock University	7:49.1	University of Western Ontario	7:49.8
Men	LM2x	McMaster University	7:55.5	University of Victoria	7:58.7	Queen's University	8:02.1
Men	M2-	Trent University	7:21.0	University of Victoria	7:23.4	University of Western Ontario	7:27.9
Men	LM4+	Brock University	6:49.9	University of British Columbia	6:51.1	University of Victoria	6:51.9
Men	M8+	University of Victoria	6:03.8	University of British Columbia	6:07.1	University of Western Ontario	6:09.2
Women	LW1x	Queen's University	8:42.6	University of Western Ontario	8:47.0	McMaster University	8:50.0
Women	W1x	University of Alberta	8:30.4	University of British Columbia	8:31.0	University of Ottawa	8:39.1
Women	LW2x	Queen's University	7:16.52	University of Victoria	7:21.34	University of Western Ontario	7:22.45
Women	W2-	University of British Columbia	8:01.8	University of Western Ontario	8:12.4	Brock University	8:15.2
Women	LW4+	Brock University	7:52.8	Queen's University	7:53.0	McGill University	7:56.3
Women	W8+	University of Western Ontario	7:05.1	University of Victoria	7:07.1	Queen's University	7:20.7

=== 2008 ===
Event			Gold		Silver		Bronze
Men	M1x	Brock University	7:01.66	University of Alberta	7:05.75	University of Victoria	7:12.27
Men	LM1x	University of Victoria	5:58.29	Queen's University	6:00.66	University of Western Ontario	6:00.92
Men	LM2x	University of Western Ontario	6:05.78	University of Victoria	6:06.88	Brock University	6:08.80
Men	M2-	University of Victoria	7:12.76	McGill University	7:17.01	University of Western Ontario	7:18.90
Men	LM4+	University of Western Ontario	6:27.16	Queen's University	6:29.12	Brock University	6:41.50
Men	M8+	University of Western Ontario	4:53.19	University of British Columbia	4:54.63	University of Victoria	4:56.93
Women	LW1x	Western University	8:53.71	Queen's University	8:56.95	University of British Columbia	8:57.13
Women	W1x	University of Alberta	8:43.88	Trent University	8:48.04	University of British Columbia	8:51.60
Women	LW2x	Queen's University	7:16.52	University of Victoria	7:21.34	University of Western Ontario	7:22.45
Women	W2-	University of British Columbia	7:12.99	Brock University	7:19.07	University of Victoria	7:22.40
Women	LW4+	Queen's University	6:10.76	University of Western Ontario	6:11.88	University of Victoria	6:12.45
Women	W8+	University of Western Ontario	6:58.28	University of British Columbia	6:58.62	University of Victoria	7:01.47

=== 2007 ===
Event			Gold		Silver		Bronze
Men	M1x	University of Victoria	7:29.15	University of Western Ontario	7:34.75	University of Alberta	7:36.85
Men	LM1x	University of Western Ontario	7:40.27	University of Victoria	7:44.91	Queen's University	7:48.16
Men	LM2x	University of Western Ontario	6:55.04	University of Victoria	6:59.65	Queen's University	7:04.87
Men	M2-	Queen's University	6:57.28	University of Western Ontario	6:58.66	Brock University	7:00.51
Men	LM4+	Queen's University	6:47.95	University of Western Ontario		University of British Columbia	
Men	M8+	University of Western Ontario	6:04.95	University of Victoria	6:07.30	Queen's University	6:07.55
Women	LW1x	Queen's University	8:21.79	University of Western Ontario	8:24.65	University of British Columbia	8:26.54
Women	W1x	University of Victoria	8:10.18	Trent University	8:15.00	University of British Columbia	8:24.32
Women	LW2x	Queen's University	7:43.49	Brock University	7:53.05	University of Victoria	8:04.66
Women	W2-	University of Victoria	8:04.00	University of British Columbia		Trent University	
Women	LW4+	University of Western Ontario		Brock University		Queen's University	
Women	W8+	University of Victoria	6:49.01	Queen's University	6:51.60	Trent University	6:53.97

=== 2006 ===
Event			Gold		Silver		Bronze
Men	M1x	University of Western Ontario	7:09.86	Brock University	7:13.43	University of Victoria	7:15.00
Men	LM1x	Queen's University	7:17.02	Carleton University	7:21.68	University of Alberta	7:26.76
Men	LM2x	University of Western Ontario	6:36.82	University of Victoria	6:46.37	Queen's University	6:58.65
Men	M2-	Trent University	6:46.63	University of Western Ontario	6:47.65	Queen's University	6:50.14
Men	LM4+	University of Western Ontario	6:30.14	Brock University	6:34.98	Queen's University	6:38.53
Men	M8+	University of Western Ontario	5:56.45	University of Victoria	6:02.83	University of British Columbia	6:03.92
Women	LW1x	University of Alberta	7:56.84	University of Toronto	8:05.01	University of British Columbia	8:09.33
Women	W1x	University of Western Ontario	7:23.19	University of British Columbia	7:40.34	Queen's University	7:43.18
Women	LW2x	University of Western Ontario	7:50.92	University of British Columbia	7:54.18	Simon Fraser University	8:01.07
Women	W2-	Brock University	7:50.41	University of Western Ontario	7:53.48	University of Victoria	7:58.99
Women	LW4+	Queen's University	7:32.27	University of Western Ontario	7:35.26	University of Victoria	7:37.02
Women	W8+	University of British Columbia	6:36.93	University of Western Ontario	6:40.25	University of Victoria	6:42.97

=== 2005 ===
Event			Gold		Silver		Bronze
Men	M1x	University of British Columbia	7:32.19	University of Toronto	7:34.84	University of Alberta	7:34.99
Men	LM1x	University of Victoria	7:32.56	University of Alberta	7:33.25	Brock University	7:41.17
Men	LM2x	Brock University	6:46.68	Queen's University	6:53.89	University of Toronto	7:03.12
Men	M2-	University of British Columbia	6:35.04	University of Western Ontario	6:37.87	McMaster University	6:38.02
Men	LM4+	Queen's University	6:26.98	University of Western Ontario	6:31.85	Brock University	6:34.06
Men	M8+	University of British Columbia	5:36.77	University of Western Ontario	5:41.84	Queen's University	5:41.97
Women	LW1x	University of Toronto	7:55.21	Trent University	7:57.48	University of Alberta	8:03.98
Women	W1x	University of Western Ontario	8:08.11	University of British Columbia	8:15.23	University of Guelph	8:20.48
Women	LW2x	University of Victoria	7:33.46	University of British Columbia	7:44.76	Queen's University	7:48.38
Women	W2-	University of Western Ontario	7:56.64	University of Victoria	7:59.87	Brock University	8:06.95
Women	LW4+	University of Victoria	7:01.49	Queen's University	7:12.18	University of British Columbia	7:16.86
Women	W8+	University of Western Ontario	6:24.91	University of Victoria	6:27.95	University of British Columbia	6:34.71

=== 2004 ===
Event			Gold		Silver		Bronze
Men	M1x	Trent University	7:21.98	University of Victoria	7:29.08	University of Toronto	7:36.94
Men	LM1x	Brock University	7:33.59	University of Toronto	7:41.57	Queen's University	7:43.60
Men	LM2x	Brock University	6:27.69	Queen's University	6:32.28	University of Victoria	6:41.19
Men	M2-	Queen's University	6:24.57	Brock University	6:30.00	University of Victoria	6:43.49
Men	LM4+	Brock University	6:41.63	University of Victoria	6:44.00	Queen's University	6:44.10
Men	M8+	University of Victoria	6:03.47	McGill University	6:07.74	Queen's University	6:10.06
Women	LW1x	University of Victoria	8:19.54	Queen's University	8:22.83	University of British Columbia	8:29.07
Women	W1x	University of Western Ontario	7:23.19	University of British Columbia	7:40.34	Queen's University	7:43.18
Women	LW2x	University of Victoria	7:36.53	University of British Columbia	7:41.05	Queen's University	7:48.08
Women	W2-	University of British Columbia	7:43.19	University of Western Ontario	7:56.96	University of Victoria	7:58.47
Women	LW4+	University of Victoria	7:43.19	Queen's University	7:56.96	University of British Columbia	7:58.47
Women	W8+	University of British Columbia	6:20.64	University of Western Ontario	6:24.27	University of Victoria	6:29.45

=== 2003 ===
Event			Gold		Silver		Bronze
Men	M1x	University of British Columbia	7:20.88	Brock University	7:25.87	Trent University	7:26.11
Men	LM1x	University of Victoria	7:04.51	Trent University	7:05.57	Queen's University	7:20.97
Men	LM2x	Brock University	6:27.69	Queen's University	6:32.28	University of Victoria	6:41.19
Men	M2-	University of Victoria	6:45.03	University of British Columbia	6:48.10	McMaster University	6:59.27
Men	LM4+	Brock University	6:31.24	University of Victoria	6:34.95	Queen's University	6:36.64
Men	M8+	Brock University	5:41.75	University of Victoria	5:42.80	Trent University	5:45.82
Women	LW1x	Queen's University	8:00.90	University of Western Ontario	8:05.43	Simon Fraser University	8:06.56
Women	W1x	University of Western Ontario	7:23.19	University of British Columbia	7:40.34	Queen's University	7:43.18
Women	LW2x	University of Victoria	7:45.76	Queen's University	7:53.33	University of Western Ontario	7:55.88
Women	W2-	University of Victoria	7:31.51	University of British Columbia	7:43.28	Simon Fraser University	7:55.70
Women	LW4+	Queen's University	7:10.56	University of Victoria	7:18.04	University of Western Ontario	7:23.09
Women	W8+	University of Victoria	6:22.58	University of British Columbia	6:22.59	Queen's University	

=== 2002 ===
Event			Gold		Silver	Bronze
Men	M1x	University of British Columbia	6:53.19	Lakehead University	University of Victoria	
Men	LM1x	Brock University	7:04.84	University of Western Ontario	University of Toronto	
Men	LM2x	Brock University	6:21.55	Queen's University	University of British Columbia	
Men	M2-	University of Victoria	6:30.54	Simon Fraser University	Brock University	
Men	LM4+	Brock University	6:08.46	University of Victoria	University of Western Ontario	
Men	M8+	University of Victoria	5:38.17	Brock University	University of Toronto	
Women	LW1x	University of Victoria	7:44.8	Queen's University	University of Western Ontario	
Women	W1x	University of Western Ontario	7:31.71	University of British Columbia	University of Victoria	
Women	LW2x	University of Victoria	6:58.85	University of Western Ontario	University of British Columbia	
Women	W2-	University of Victoria	7:19.91	Simon Fraser University	University of Western Ontario	
Women	LW4+	University of Victoria	6:48.41	Brock University	Queen's University	
Women	W8+	University of Victoria	6:13.70	University of British Columbia	Simon Fraser University	

=== 2001 ===
Event			Gold		Silver		Bronze
Men	M1x	Royal Military College of Canada	7:35.57	Simon Fraser University	7:36.79	University of Western Ontario	7:37.48
Men	LM1x	Lakehead University	7:23.31	University of Victoria	7:29.53	Brock University	7:36.71
Men	LM2x	University of Victoria	7:34.68	Brock University	7:46.36	University of Toronto	7:55.37
Men	M2-	University of Victoria	7:11.09	University of British Columbia	7:25.66	University of Western Ontario	7:30.90
Men	LM4+	Brock University	7:00.78	University of Western Ontario	7:08.22	University of Victoria	7:11.26
Men	M8+	University of Victoria	5:49.49	University of British Columbia	5:52.63	Brock University	5:55.75
Women	LW1x	University of Western Ontario		McGill University		University of Victoria	
Women	W1x	University of Western Ontario		University of Victoria		University of British Columbia	
Women	LW2x	University of Victoria		University of Western Ontario		McGill University	
Women	W2-	University of Victoria		Brock University		Trent University	
Women	LW4+	University of Victoria		Brock University		University of British Columbia	
Women	W8+	University of Victoria		Queen's University		Brock University	

=== 2000 ===
Event			Gold		Silver		Bronze
Men	M1x	University of Victoria	7:09.4	University of British Columbia	7:11.2	University of Western Ontario	7:18.0
Men	LM1x	University of British Columbia	7:22.6	University of Victoria	7:26.1	University of Alberta	7:27.8
Men	LM2x	University of Victoria	6:55.0	Brock University	6:59.7	University of British Columbia	7:00.6
Men	M2-	University of Victoria	6:40.4	Brock University	6:44.2	University of Western Ontario	6:48.1
Men	M8+	University of Victoria	5:49.1	University of British Columbia	5:50.6	University of Western Ontario	5:51.7
Women	LW1x	University of Victoria	8:09.7	University of British Columbia	8:11.5	Carleton University	8:16.8
Women	W1x	University of British Columbia	8:07.3	University of Victoria	8:12.9	University of Western Ontario	8:18.3
Women	LW2x	University of Victoria	7:30.3	University of British Columbia	7:35.4	Trent University	7:47.3
Women	W2-	University of Victoria	7:32.1	University of British Columbia	8:05.8	Simon Fraser University	8:12.4
Women	W8+	University of Victoria	6:12.5	University of British Columbia	6:26.3	Trent University	6:33.0

=== 1999 ===
Event			Gold		Silver		Bronze
Men	M1x	University of Western Ontario	7:27.2	University of Victoria	7:32.6	Brock University	7:35.9
Men	LM1x	University of Western Ontario	7:33.7	Brock University	7:38.0	University of Victoria	7:46.02
Men	LM2x	University of Western Ontario	6:57.3	University of Victoria	7:03.8	Brock University	7:16.5
Men	M2-	Brock University	7:01.3	University of Victoria	7:02.6	University of British Columbia	7:19.8
Men	M8+	Brock University	5:55.8	University of Western Ontario	5:57.5	University of Victoria	6:03.5
Women	LW1x	University of Western Ontario	8:25.6	University of Toronto	8:33.7	Carleton University	8:38.7
Women	W1x	University of Western Ontario	8:28.9	University of British Columbia	8:29.6	Queen's University	8:34.8
Women	LW2x	University of Toronto	7:40.2	University of Western Ontario	7:42.7	Queen's University	7:45.3
Women	W2-	University of Victoria	7:44.8	University of Ottawa	7:57.7	University of Western Ontario	7:59.7
Women	W8+	University of Victoria	6:44.0	University of British Columbia	6:53.4	University of Western Ontario	6:59.5

=== 1998 ===
Event			Gold		Silver		Bronze
Men	M1x	University of British Columbia Sean Richardson	7:18.6	Trent University David Kay	7:19.9	University of Victoria Andrew Hoskins	7:25.7
Men	LM1x	University of Victoria Chris Davidson	7:31.7	Brock University Pat Cody	7:41.2	Dalhousie University Chris Graham	7:48.8
Men	LM2x	University of Victoria Adrian McFarlane Chris Davidson	6:31.4	University of Western Ontario Liam Parsons Dafydd Davies	6:32.0	Brock University Pat Cody Chris Rinaldo	6:35.5
Men	M2-	University of Victoria Joe Stankevicius Kevin Light	6:45.0	Brock University Bryden McDonald Matt Swick	6:50.7	University of Western Ontario Vaughn Abbey Ryan Neufeld	7:01.3
Men	M8+	University of Victoria		University of Western Ontario		Brock University	
Women	LW1x	University of British Columbia Tracy Duncan	8:00.1	McGill University Genevieve Meredith	8:13.0	University of Manitoba Kristann Magnusson	8:18.5
Women	W1x	University of Victoria Kristen Wall	7:49.6	University of Western Ontario Jane Thornton	no time	McGill University Genevieve Meredith	no time
Women	LW2x	University of British Columbia Tracy Duncan Kendra Wood	7:37.4	University of Western Ontario Leigh Ann Niven Jessica Minor	7:49.1	University of Manitoba Kristenn Magnusson Tracy Brown	7:55.0
Women	W2-	University of Victoria Nancy Sheils Buffy Alexander	7:39.8	University of Alberta Pauline Van Roessel Rachael Sproule	7:48.3	University of Western Ontario Niki Vankerk Rolslyn Macleod	7:52.4
Women	W8+	University of Victoria Carolyn Rudden Pam Elliott Karen Clark Alia Zawacki Rachelle de Jong Jen Browett Nancy Sheils Kristen Wall Buffy Alexander	6:26.9	University of British Columbia Heather Wilson Sarah Bendall Kathie Eggenberger Lesley Honsborger Laura Middleton Alyson Moser Sarah Milne Tara Stavenson Adrienne Seok	6:38.6	University of Western Ontario Leanne Richardson Cara Gillis Sophie Roberge Siobhan McLaughlin Niki Vankerk Cheryl Beaulieu Jane Thornton Roslyn Macleod Amanda Schweinbenz	6:39.5

=== 1997 ===
Event			Gold		Silver		Bronze
Men	M1x	University of Western Ontario Iain Brambell	7:03.6	University of Victoria Adam Parfitt	7:07.1	Brock University Matt Swick	7:11.8
Men	LM1x	University of Victoria Chris Davidson	7:05.1	University of Western Ontario Rob Park	7:13.0	Brock University Pat Cody	7:17.1
Men	LM2x	University of Western Ontario Rob Park Iain Brambell	6:28.7	Brock University Dan Creamer Pat Cody	6:34.2	University of Victoria Dave Symonds Adrian McFarlaine	6:42.2
Men	M2-	Brock University Jeff Somervile Ross Beattie	6:34.8	University of Victoria Paul Hawksworth Barney Williams	6:34.9	University of British Columbia Derek Zander Jiri Tichopad	6:52.4
Men	M8+	University of Victoria Joe Stankevicius Mike Grace Adam Parfitt Chris Davidson Paul Hawksworth Dave Jakeway Spencer Martin Barney Williams Sue Jackson	5:36.1	McGill University Pail Sturgess Douglas Vandor Paul Campbell Andrew Tees Kevin Penney John Muir Ben Storey Scott Pritchard Josselyn Rimel	5:41.4	Brock University Brian Brown Bryden Mcdonald Bart Devries Darcy Usbrone Dan Creamer Carlo Costantini Jeff Somerville Ross Beattie Laura Purdy	5:41.5
Women	LW1x	University of British Columbia Tracy Duncan	7.56.7	McGill University Gen Meredith	8:03.5	University of Western Ontario Leigh Ann Niven	8:07.2
Women	W1x	University of Victoria Kristen Wall	7:55.2	University of Western Ontario Erin Crawford	8:17.1	Queen's University Blaire Baker	8:34.0
Women	LW2x	University of British Columbia Kendra Wood Tracy Duncan	7:15.7	University of Western Ontario Andrea Hansen Leigh Ann Niven	7:34.5	University of Alberta Corina Kerrison Lisa Ludwig	7:36.5
Women	W2-	University of Victoria Nancy Sheils Buffy Alexander	7:17.6	University of Alberta Theresa Rwalin Pauline Van Roessel	7:21.0	University of British Columbia Sarah Jane Hutchinson Colleen Duncan	7:35.7
Women	W8+	University of Victoria Erin Sloan Senta Kaiser Veronica Soron Karen Clark Nancy Sheils Jamie Garrett Kristen Wall Buffy Alexander Carys Jones	6:17.0	University of British Columbia Tara Stevenson Sarah Milne Lesley Honsberger Margaret Brodie Aly Leith Kathy Eggenberger Alyson Moser Mel O-Neil Kristy McCoughan	6:26.0	Queen's University Karen McGlone Blaire Baker Nicole Acerra Katia Dyrda Colleen Duncan Christine Brown Darah Jane Hutchinson Penny Smith Katie Popetty	6:26.8
