= Doug Davies (Canadian football) =

Canadian football player (born 1964)

Profile
- Position: Offensive lineman

Personal information
- Born: December 22, 1964 (age 61); Toronto, Ontario, Canada
- Listed height: 6 ft 4 in (1.93 m)
- Listed weight: 275 lb (125 kg)

Career information
- High school: Applewood Heights Secondary School
- University: Simon Fraser University
- CFL draft: 1987: 2nd round, 11th overall pick

Career history
- 1988: Hamilton Tiger-Cats
- 1989–1994: Calgary Stampeders
- 1995–1997: Hamilton Tiger-Cats
- 1997–1999: British Columbia Lions

Awards and highlights
- Grey Cup champion (1992)

Doug Davies (born December 22, 1964) is a Canadian former professional football offensive lineman who played twelve seasons in the Canadian Football League (CFL) for three different teams. He played college football at Simon Fraser University. He was a part of the Calgary Stampeders' Grey Cup victory in 1992.

After retirement, he entered chiropractic college in Portland, Oregon at Western States Chiropractic College, earning his D.C. license in 2004.

Doug is also a accomplish water color artist, and has sold many paintings.
