= Yulia Alexandrova =

Russian rower

Personal information
- Native name: Юлия Ивановна Александрова
- Full name: Yuliya Ivanovna Aleksandrova
- Born: 6 March 1979 (age 46)
- Height: 1.78 m (5 ft 10 in)
- Weight: 73 kg (161 lb)

Sport
- Country: Russia
- Sport: Rowing
- Club: Dynamo St. Petersburg, St. Petersburg

Yulia Alexandrova (born 6 March 1979) is a Russian rower. She competed in the women's single sculls event at the 2000 Summer Olympics in Sydney.
