= Shorten (surname) =

Shorten is an English and Irish surname, the etymology of which traces back to Norman and Irish Gaelic words. The surname is found predominantly in Ireland with roots in County Cork, with significant numbers recorded in the United States, Canada, Australia, Scotland, England, New Zealand, South Africa, Wales and Northern Ireland. Limited numbers of individuals with the surname Shorten have been recorded in Germany, Sweden, Brazil, Thailand, Zimbabwe, Uganda, the United Arab Emirates, Japan, China, France and Spain.

== Origin ==
Theories about the origin of this surname include:

- It originates from the village of Shorton in Devon, England
- It originates from the Norman name Shorten, which was used to describe short or stock-necked people
- It originates from the Irish Gaelic Seartáin, which is a variant of the Irish name Soirtéil (Shortell or Shorthall)

== Notable people ==
Notable people with this surname include:

- Anthony Shorten, Australian politician
- Bill Shorten, Leader of the Australian Labour Party 2013 - 2019 and of the Shorten Shadow Ministry
- Clive Shorten, English figure skater and British national champion 1999
- Chloe Shorten, Australian corporate affairs specialist
- Chick Shorten, American baseball player for the Boston Red Sox, Detroit Tigers, St. Louis Browns and Cincinnati Reds
- George Shorten, Australian rules footballer for Essendon
- Harry Shorten, American writer and cartoonist
- Jack Shorten, Australian rules footballer for Collingwood
- John Shorten, Irish Gaelic footballer for Cork County team from 1908 - 1915
- Paul Shorten, Canadian football player for the Winnipeg Blue Bombers
- Rebecca Shorten, Northern Irish rower, European Championship silver medalist and World Championship bronze medalist
- Teddy Shorten, Australian rules footballer for North Melbourne and Essendon
