= Shorton =

Shorton may refer to:

- Robert Shorton, English churchman
- Shorton, Devon, a district of Paignton, Devon, England

== See also ==
- Shorten
