= Luc Mullinder =

New Zealand gridiron football player (born 1980)

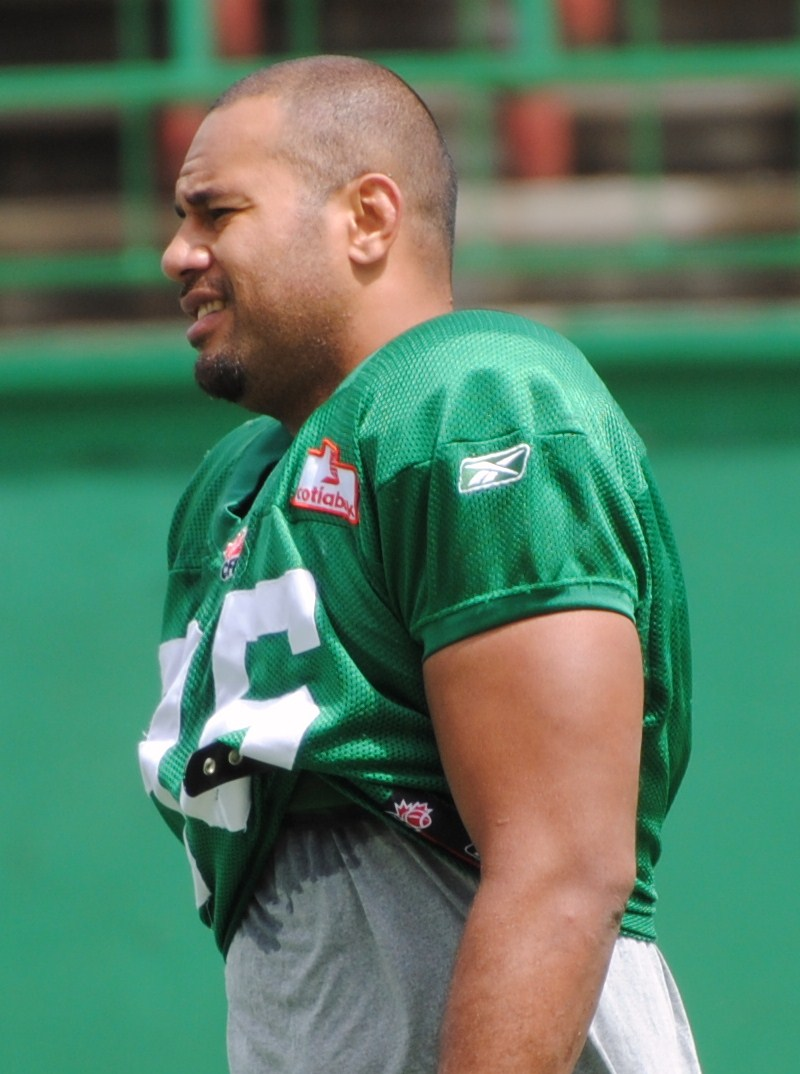
- Mullinder with the Saskatchewan Roughriders in 2010

No. 95, 99, 90, 93
- Position: Defensive end

Personal information
- Born: September 25, 1980 (age 46); Auckland, New Zealand
- Listed height: 6 ft 4 in (1.93 m)
- Listed weight: 288 lb (131 kg)

Career information
- High school: Applewood Heights (Mississauga, Ontario, Canada)
- College: Michigan State
- CFL draft: 2004: 4th round, 31st overall pick

Career history
- 2004–2011: Saskatchewan Roughriders
- 2011: Montreal Alouettes
- 2011: Hamilton Tiger-Cats
- 2012: Montreal Alouettes

Awards and highlights
- Grey Cup champion (2007)
- Stats at CFL.ca (archive)

Luc Mullinder (born September 25, 1980) is a New Zealand-Canadian former professional football defensive end who played nine seasons in the Canadian Football League (CFL). Mullinder was originally drafted 31st overall by the Saskatchewan Roughriders in the 2004 CFL draft and spent the first eight years of his career with the team. He also played for the Montreal Alouettes and Hamilton Tiger-Cats. He played college football at Michigan State.

== Early life ==
Luc Mullinder was born on September 25, 1980, in Auckland, New Zealand. He attended Applewood Heights Secondary School in Mississauga, Ontario, Canada.

Mullinder attended Michigan State on a football scholarship. He began his college career as a tight end in 2000, catching two passes for 20 yards. He later moved to defense.

== Professional career ==
Mullinder was drafted in the fourth round, 31st overall, by the Saskatchewan Roughriders in the 2004 CFL draft and would go on to play for eight seasons with the team. He won a Grey Cup championship with the team in 2007. He was traded to the Alouettes on August 8, 2011 for import receiver Dallas Baker and was released by the Alouettes on August 22, 2011. He was signed by the Hamilton Tiger-Cats on August 23, 2011 and released the following off-season on February 1, 2012. He was re-signed by the Alouettes on March 26, 2012. On April 30, 2013, Mullinder signed a one-day contract with Saskatchewan so that he could retire as a member of the Roughriders.
