= Western Mustangs =

Athletic program of the University of Western Ontario

- University: University of Western Ontario
- Nickname: Mustangs
- Association: U Sports
- Conference: Ontario University Athletics
- Athletic director: Christine Stapleton
- Location: London, Ontario
- First year: 1913; 113 years ago
- Varsity teams: 46 (23 men's, 23 women's)
- Football stadium: Western Alumni Stadium
- Basketball arena: Alumni Hall
- Ice hockey arena: Thompson Arena
- Baseball stadium: Labatt Park
- Softball stadium: Stronach Park
- Soccer stadium: Western Alumni Stadium
- Aquatics center: Western Student Recreation Centre
- Lacrosse stadium: Mustangs Field
- Outdoor track and field venue: Thompson Arena
- Volleyball arena: Alumni Hall; Thompson Arena
- Rugby venue: Alumni Field
- Colours: Purple and White
- Mascot: J.W. the Mustang
- Fight song: "Western"
- Website: westernmustangs.ca
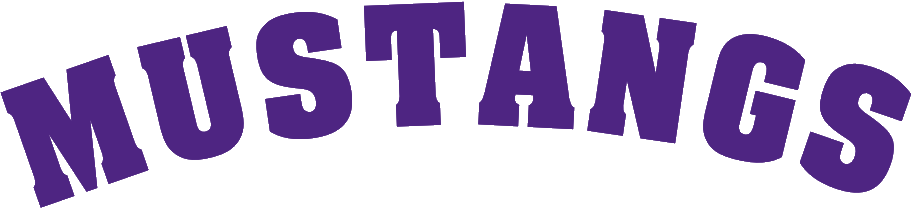

The Western Mustangs are the athletic teams that represent Western University in London, Ontario, Canada. The school's athletic program supports 46 varsity teams. Their mascot is a Mustang named J.W. and the school colours are purple and white. The university's varsity teams compete in the Ontario University Athletics conference and the national U Sports organization. Western University offers 21 varsity sports for men and 19 for women which compete in the OUA conference. The university also offers cheerleading (co-ed and all-girls), women's ringette, women's softball, table tennis (men's and women's) and ultimate frisbee (open-class and women's), which compete outside the OUA conference, in sport-specific conferences and divisions.

The current athletic director is Christine Stapleton, who started at the university in 2017. Her predecessor, Therese Quigley, held the role for 8 years starting in 2009.

Many Western varsity programs lead Canadian universities in the number of championships won. The women's volleyball team has won 10 provincial championships, the rowing team has won 23 provincial championships, the basketball teams have won 24 provincial championships, the football team has won 31 provincial championships and the men's squash team has won 45 provincial championships, with 36 being consecutive. The Western Mustangs football team has won eight Vanier Cup national championships, in 1971, 1974, 1976, 1977, 1989, 1994, 2017 and 2021.

Additionally, the cheerleading team has won the national championship 33 times, including 24 consecutive. The university also has the largest university marching band in Canada.

== Varsity teams ==
The University of Western Ontario's Athletics program currently supports 46 varsity programs.

While technically not considered a varsity team, Western has a university ringette team which competes annually in the Canadian national University Challenge Cup.

| Men's sports | Women's sports |
|---|---|
| Badminton | Badminton |
| Baseball | Basketball |
| Basketball | Cross Country |
| Cross Country | Curling |
| Curling | Fencing |
| Fencing | Field Hockey |
| Football | Figure Skating |
| Figure Skating | Golf |
| Golf | Ice Hockey |
| Ice Hockey | Lacrosse |
| Lacrosse | Ringette |
| Rowing | Rowing |
| Rugby | Rugby |
| Soccer | Soccer |
| Squash | Softball |
| Swimming | Squash |
| Table Tennis | Swimming |
| Tennis | Table Tennis |
| Track & Field | Tennis |
| Ultimate | Track & Field |
| Volleyball | Ultimate |
| Waterpolo | Volleyball |
| Wrestling | Wrestling |

=== Badminton ===
Badminton started in the early 1930s at Western as a club, but transitioned to a varsity sport once recognized in the OUA. The team consistently places in the top 3 during OUA championships, and has won 10 OUA championships, with the last one being in 2014.

During the 1970s, the team saw much acclaim. Jamie Paulson attended Western at this time and dominated in both singles and doubles at OUAA tournaments in the 1970–71 season, winning 33 out of 36 matches. This streak continued even after Paulson's departure, and Western won the OUAA badminton championships in 1970–71, 1972–73, 1975–76, 1976–77, and 1977–78 seasons. More recently, former alumni Alex Bruce competed in the 2012 Summer Olympics as well as win a gold medal at the 2011 Pan American Games.

=== Baseball ===
The OUA adopted baseball into the conference in 2001 and since then, the men's baseball team have won 6 total OUA championships in 2005, 2006, 2007, 2009, 2015 and 2016. The current head coach is Mike Lumley, a former Detroit Tigers fifth round draft pick. Lumley has been named OUA Coach of the Year in 2001, 2004, 2005, and 2009.

=== Basketball ===
==== Men's basketball ====
The men's basketball team plays its home games in Alumni Hall gymnasium. The Mustangs last won a conference championship in 2001–02, for a total of 25 OUA conference titles since 1908. The men's team has won 1 national championship in the 1990–91 season. The current head coach of the Mustangs is Brad Campbell, who has been the head coach since 2006. Campbell took over after the previous coach Craig Boydell. Boydell had a 16-year reign and brought the team to their only national title in the 1990–91 season.

Men's basketball originally started in 1903 as a team of medical school students. The team entered into the Ontario Amateur Basketball Association in 1911. Western arts students started a team in 1912. Western officially formed a unified Athletic Association and created one central team to represent the university as a whole in 1914.

==== Women's basketball ====
Western's women's basketball team has won 3 conference championships, in 1971–72, 1972–73 and 1973–74. The 1973–74 season became notable as the team was undefeated in league play.

=== Football ===
The Western Mustangs football team first started in 1929 and has become one of the most successful football teams in Canadian university sports. The team has won 8 Vanier Cup national titles and appeared 15 times at the championship, with the last win being in 2021. The Mustangs have also won 33 provincial Yates Cup titles, with 49 appearances.

Notable former players include: Joe Krol, Frank Cosentino, Andy Fantuz, Dick Suderman, Bob McFarlane, Frank Turville, Vaughn Martin, Daryl Waud and Tim Tindale.

The current coach is Greg Marshall and has been with the team since 2007. As of recent years, the team has been posting a 76–11 regular season record between 2008 and 2018.

=== Rowing ===
Both the men's and women's team compete in the OUA provincial league as well as a part of the national Canadian University Rowing Association. These teams have become dominating powers in Canadian university rowing, achieving 56 provincial OUA titles and 14 national titles combined. The program has also included over 45 Canadian Olympic team members as athletes, coaching staff and trainers.

The teams are based out of the Doug Wells Rowing Centre on Fanshawe Lake.

In 2019, it was announced that Western will be the hosting university for the 2022 International University Sports Federation (FISU) World University Rowing Championship. The competition will be based out of Fanshawe Lake in London, Ontario.

==== Men's rowing ====
The men's varsity rowing team joined the OUA in 1957 and since then has become a dominating team in the league. The team has won 29 provincial OUA championships, with the last one being in the 2018–19 season. The team competes nationally as part of the Canadian University Rowing Association and has won 6 national titles since 1997.

Over 20 Western rowing athletes and coaching staff have competed in the Olympics. Notable Western rowing Olympians include Roger Jackson, Al Morrow, Mike Murphy, and Phil Monckton.

On February 8, 2019, 10 members of the team won a rowing world record for the fastest time to row 1 million meters. This group rowed on an indoor erg machine for 62 hours, 27 minutes and 7 seconds, with an average pace of 1:52.4. The record category was for men's 19-and-under age group.

==== Women's rowing ====
The women's rowing team is the most decorated team in the OUA women's rowing league and has won 27 provincial titles, with the longest consecutive win-streak of 6 from 2013 to 2019. The team first started in 1969 as a recreational club, but then joined the OUA as a varsity program in 1973, once the league added the sport. They have also won 8 national titles, with the last one being in 2016.

Notable Olympians include Lesley Thompson-Willie, Heather Clarke, Angela Schneider, Silken Laumann, Marnie McBean, Heather Mandoli, Rachelle Viinberg, and Wendy Wiebe.

=== Volleyball ===
==== Men's volleyball ====
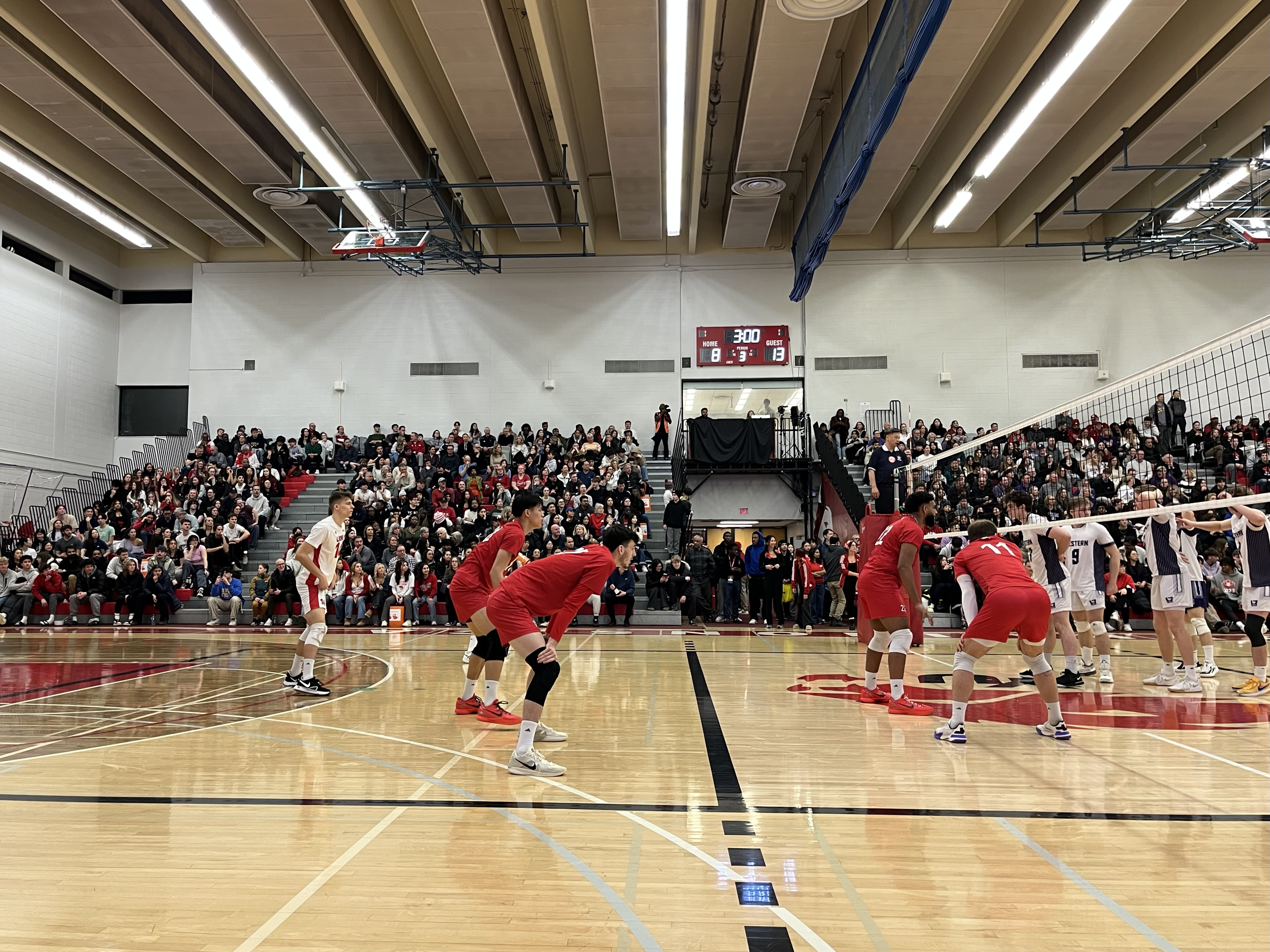
York v Western, 2025 men's volleyball game

The men's volleyball team first joined the OUA in the league's inaugural 1965–66 volleyball season and are currently part of the West division. They currently play home games in Alumni Hall. The team has won 5 provincial OUA conference championships, in 1967–68, 1968–69, 1970–71, 1975–76, and 1978–79. In 2013–14, the Mustangs won an OUA silver medal, then lost to Alberta in the Canadian U Sports championship final, bringing home a national silver medal.

The current coach of the Mustangs volleyball team is Jim Sage, who has been coaching the team since 1997. He won the OUA Coach of the Year title in 2003.

==== Women's volleyball ====
The women's volleyball team plays in the OUA West division. The team has won 11 provincial OUA conference championships, with the last one being in 2010–11. They have also won three national U Sports championships, in 1971–72, 1974–75, and 1975–76.

Prior to the OUA and U Sports recognizing women's volleyball in 1971–72, Western was known to be successful in the national Women's Intercollegiate Athletic Union. The team joined this league in 1949 and won 13 national titles from 1953 to 1970. Former Western Mustangs athletic director Therese Quigley played on the 1973–74 championship team.

== Sport clubs ==
The Recreation Sport Clubs at Western are administered by the Western Campus Recreation, a division of the Athletics Department. There are 18 sport clubs and include alternative sports such as martial arts. Each club is a student-led organization, with some additional assistance from the Athletics Department. The clubs are sanctioned under the department and have student executive leadership teams who handle all club operations, financing, activities, and equipment.

The sport clubs at Western include:

- Aikido
- Badminton
- Brazilian Jiu-Jitsu
- Cricket
- Curling
- Dragon Boat
- Equestrian
- Fencing
- Judo
- Karate
- Kendo
- Outdoors
- Seikido
- Squash
- Table Tennis
- Taekwondo
- Triathlon
- Tennis

== Athletic facilities ==
There are a number of gyms, facilities, and rooms that teams use for practicing and games.

=== Western Alumni Stadium ===
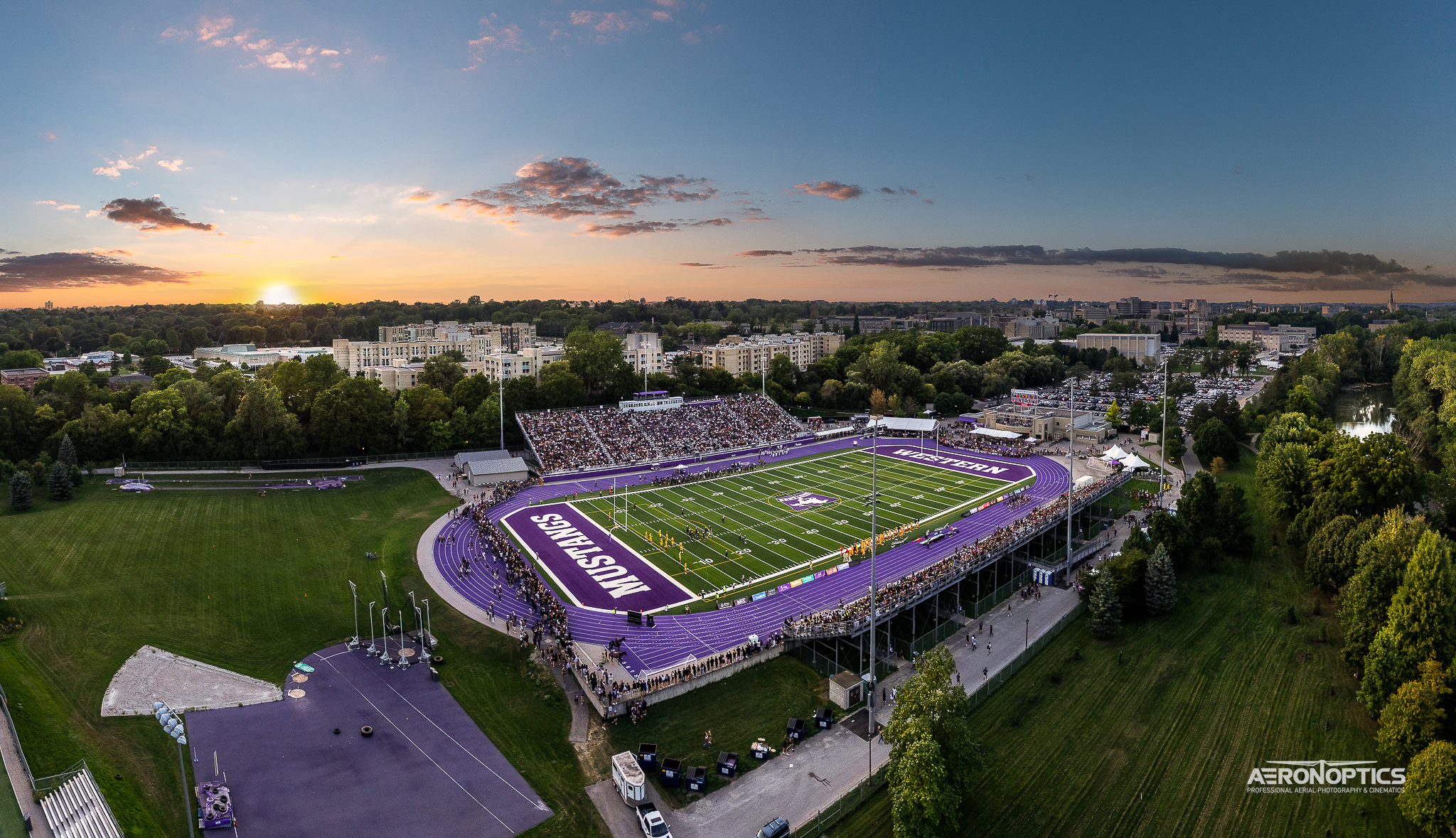
Aerial view of Western Alumni Stadium, the second-largest in the OUA

The Western Alumni Stadium (formerly, TD Stadium) was built in 2000 and has a capacity of 8,000. It is the home of the Western Mustangs football and lacrosse teams. The field size abides by CFL regulations and features an infill turf playing surface with a 2" rubberized e-layer. Surrounding the field is an eight-lane, 400m outdoor track and long-jump pit.

=== Mustangs Field ===
Mustangs Field was opened in 2013 and acts as the playing surface for the soccer and lacrosse teams. The field can seat up to 600 people in the stand-alone bleachers.

=== Alumni Field ===
Alumni Field was opened in 2013 and is the primary field for the men's and women's rugby teams. It is one of a few fields in Canada that is certified through the International Rugby Board. The field can seat up to 600 people in stand-alone bleachers.

=== Alumni Hall ===
Alumni Hall is a multi-sport auditorium and gym. It is currently has the playing court for the Western basketball and volleyball teams. It was originally opened in 1968 and is where the John P Metras Sports Museum is located. In addition to the main gymnasium, the lower floors of the building house the gym for the wrestling teams as well as a dance studio. There are several classroom facilities within the building. The Western Mustang Band is also housed in Alumni Hall.

In addition to the gym, the main auditorium has a large stage and is used as the primary location for convocation and other official University ceremonies. The auditorium can seat 1,200 in the mezzanine seats, and 2,274 total if additional chairs are set up on the court.

=== Thompson Arena and Indoor Track ===
Thompson Arena, ice hockey venue

The Thompson Arena was built in 1971 and has an NHL-sized ice rink as well as an indoor track around the rink. The men's and women's ice hockey teams use the arena alongside the ringette and figure skating teams, while the track and field team use the 200m Mondo indoor track surface. The arena seating capacity is 3,615.

The indoor track is used primarily by sprinters, distance runners, throwers, and jumpers. During indoor track and field meets, the ice surface is covered and the inner rink becomes a field surface for activities such as pole vault and high jump. As of September 2019, the track was re-surfaced and updated. This update was following criticism on the previous track's degrading condition and overuse.

The annual Don Wright track meet is hosted in the Thompson Arena.

=== Western Student Recreation Centre ===
The Western Student Recreation Centre (known as the Rec Centre or Western Rec) is a multi-level gymnasium facility and aquatic centre. It houses multiple basketball courts, volleyball courts, and squash courts, as well as a large fitness area with two floors of weight training equipment, treadmills, and fitness studios. The facility was opened in February 2009. It is directly attached to the Thompson Arena.

The Western varsity swim team and water polo team uses the 8-lane, 50m pool for training as well as hosting swim meets and competitions.

The Athletic Department offices and administration is housed within the Rec Centre.

This large facility comes as a result of a student-led initiative in 2006. Western students held a referendum to fund a majority of the building's $35.7-million cost. From this, the undergraduate and graduate students pledged to donate a total of $101-million over 30 years for the initial purchase, building maintenance and support, with $14.8-million specifically funding undergraduate and graduate student bursaries. This was announced as the largest contribution ever from a student body to a Canadian university.

=== Thames Hall ===
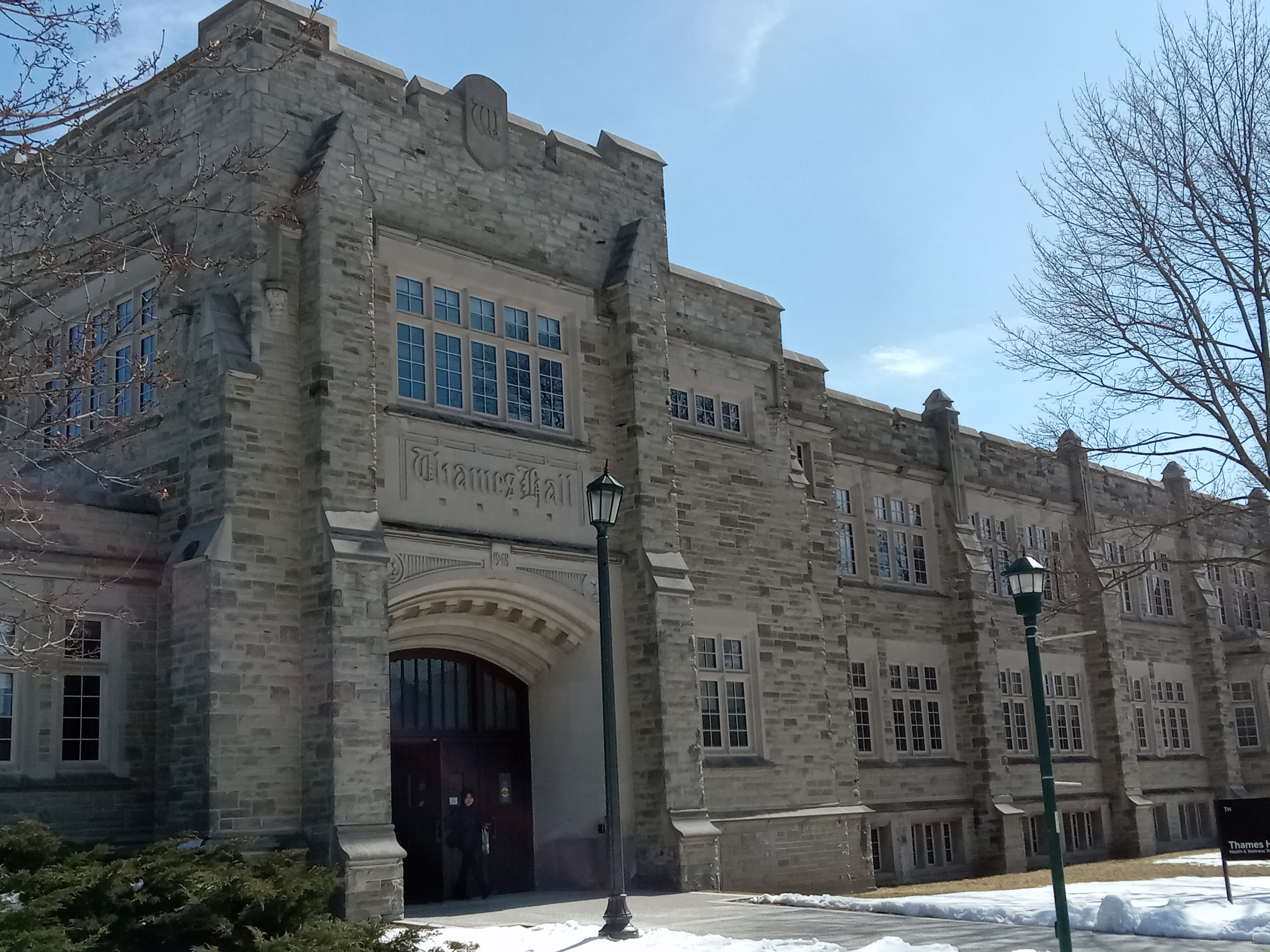
Thames Hall at the University of Western Ontario

Thames Hall was completed in 1949, led by planning and fundraising efforts of J. Howard Crocker, the director of the university's physical education department.

Before the Western Rec Centre was completed in 2009, Thames Hall was the facility used for athletic department and had a pool, gymnasium, and athletic training facilities. After completion, Thames Hall was refurbished to convert the pool into classrooms. As of 2019, Thames Hall is undergoing major renovations and they are set to be complete June 2021. The newly renovated building will house Student Health and Psychological Services, Sports and Recreation, and Student Learning and Engagement, as well as house the Kinesiology department.

== Olympians ==
Western University list of Olympians
| First | Last | Year | Sport |
|---|---|---|---|
| Chuck | Dalton | 1952 | Basketball |
| Bill | Pataky | 1952 | Basketball |
| Glen | Pettinger | 1952 | Basketball |
| Bob | Phibbs | 1952 | Basketball |
| Harry | Wade | 1952 | Basketball |
| George | Wearring | 1952 | Basketball |
| Coulter | Osbourne | 1956 | Basketball |
| Barry | Ager | 1960 | Basketball |
| Don | McCrae | 1960 | Basketball |
| Ray | Monnot | 1960 | Basketball |
| Barry | Howson | 1964 | Basketball |
| Paul | Thomas | 1952 | Basketball (coach) |
| Don | McCrae | 1984 | Basketball (coach) |
| Vic | Emery | 1964 | Bobsleigh |
| Mike | Young | 1968 | Bobsleigh |
| David | Leuty | 1980 | Bobsleigh |
| David | Leuty | 1988 | Bobsleigh |
| Chris | Lori | 1988 | Bobsleigh |
| Chris | Lori | 1992 | Bobsleigh |
| Chris | Lori | 1996 | Bobsleigh |
| Chris | Lori | 1998 | Bobsleigh |
| Lamont | Gordon | 1964 | Bobsleigh |
| Bob | Storey | 1968 | Bobsleigh |
| Bob | Storey | 1972 | Bobsleigh |
| Bob | Storey | 1976 | Bobsleigh (coach) |
| Allan | Maclachlan | 1980 | Bobsleigh |
| Allan | Maclachlan | 1984 | Bobsleigh |
| Barb | Olmsted | 1984 | Canoeing |
| Barb | Olmsted | 1988 | Canoeing |
| Eric | Smith | 1984 | Canoeing |
| Eric | Smith | 1988 | Canoeing |
| Skip | Phoenix | 1976 | Diving |
| Skip | Phoenix | 1988 | Diving |
| Skip | Phoenix | 1992 | Diving (coach) |
| Bob | Foxcroft | 1964 | Fencing |
| Bob | Foxcroft | 1972 | Fencing |
| Andrew | Griffiths | 2000 | Field Hockey |
| Lynn | Nightingale | 1976 | Figure Skating |
| Mike | Inglis | 1992 | Gymnastics |
| Brian | Conacher | 1964 | Hockey |
| Roger | Jackson | 1964 | Rowing |
| Roger | Jackson | 1968 | Rowing |
| Roger | Jackson | 1972 | Rowing |
| Jim | Walker | 1972 | Rowing |
| Mike | Neary | 1972 | Rowing |
| Mike | Neary | 1976 | Rowing |
| Monica | Draeger | 1976 | Rowing |
| Marnie | McBean | 1992 | Rowing |
| Marnie | McBean | 1996 | Rowing |
| Marnie | McBean | 2000 | Rowing |
| Nancy | Higgins | 1976 | Rowing |
| Al | Morrow | 1976 | Rowing |
| Becky | Stevenson | 1976 | Rowing |
| Andy | Van Ruyven | 1976 | Rowing |
| Phil | Monckton | 1976 | Rowing |
| Phil | Monckton | 1984 | Rowing |
| Heather | Clarke | 1980 | Rowing |
| Heather | Clarke | 1984 | Rowing |
| Heather | Clarke | 1988 | Rowing |
| Lesley | Thompson-Willie | 1980 | Rowing |
| Lesley | Thompson-Willie | 1984 | Rowing |
| Lesley | Thompson-Willie | 1988 | Rowing |
| Lesley | Thompson-Willie | 1992 | Rowing |
| Lesley | Thompson-Willie | 1996 | Rowing |
| Lesley | Thompson-Willie | 2000 | Rowing |
| Lesley | Thompson-Willie | 2008 | Rowing |
| Barb | Armbrust | 1984 | Rowing |
| Cathy | Lund | 1984 | Rowing |
| Angela | Schneider | 1984 | Rowing |
| John | Houlding | 1984 | Rowing |
| John | Houlding | 1988 | Rowing |
| Harold | Backer | 1984 | Rowing |
| Harold | Backer | 1988 | Rowing |
| Harold | Backer | 1992 | Rowing |
| Silken | Laumann | 1984 | Rowing |
| Silken | Laumann | 1988 | Rowing |
| Silken | Laumann | 1992 | Rowing |
| Silken | Laumann | 1996 | Rowing |
| Jennifer | (Walinga) Doey | 1988 | Rowing |
| Jennifer | (Walinga) Doey | 1992 | Rowing |
| John | Wallace | 1988 | Rowing |
| John | Wallace | 1992 | Rowing |
| Brian | Saunderson | 1992 | Rowing |
| Mike | Forgeron | 1992 | Rowing |
| Mike | Forgeron | 1996 | Rowing |
| Jeff | Lay | 1996 | Rowing |
| Maria | Maunder | 1996 | Rowing |
| Renata | Troc | 1996 | Rowing |
| Wendy | Wiebe | 1996 | Rowing |
| Michele | Mellow | 1996 | Rowing |
| Iain | Brambell | 2000 | Rowing |
| Iain | Brambell | 2004 | Rowing |
| Iain | Brambell | 2008 | Rowing |
| Jon | Beare | 2000 | Rowing |
| Jon | Beare | 2004 | Rowing |
| Jon | Beare | 2008 | Rowing |
| Liam | Parsons | 2008 | Rowing |
| Matt | Jensen | 2008 | Rowing |
| Adam | Kreek | 2008 | Rowing |
| Cam | Sylvester | 2008 | Rowing |
| Jane | Rumball | 2008 | Rowing |
| Romina | Stefancic | 2008 | Rowing |
| Heather | Mandoli | 2008 | Rowing |
| Rachelle | de Jong | 2008 | Rowing |
| Kris | Korzeniowski | 1976 | Rowing (coach) |
| Al | Morrow | 1980 | Rowing (coach) |
| Al | Morrow | 1984 | Rowing (coach) |
| Al | Morrow | 1992 | Rowing (coach) |
| Al | Morrow | 1996 | Rowing (coach) |
| Al | Morrow | 2000 | Rowing (coach) |
| Al | Morrow | 2008 | Rowing (coach) |
| Jimmy | Joy | 1984 | Rowing (coach) |
| Jimmy | Joy | 1988 | Rowing (coach) |
| Rudy | Wieler | 1984 | Rowing (coach) |
| Bob | Marlow | 1984 | Rowing (coach) |
| Ted | Daigneault | 1984 | Rowing (coach) |
| Volker | Nolte | 1996 | Rowing (coach) |
| Volker | Nolte | 2000 | Rowing (coach) |
| Carolyn | Caesar | 2008 | Rowing (therapist) |
| John | Kerr | 1984 | Sailing |
| Paul | Shaw | 1996 | Shooting (Trap Shooting) |
| Duff | Gibson | 2006 | Skeleton |
| Ken | Read | 1976 | Skiing |
| Ken | Read | 1980 | Skiing |
| Tom | Overend | 1976 | Speed Skating |
| Mel | Brock | 1912 | Track and Field |
| Alex | Munroe | 1928 | Track and Field |
| Johnny | Loaring | 1936 | Track and Field |
| Bill | Larochelle | 1948 | Track and Field |
| Bob | McFarlane | 1948 | Track and Field |
| Don | McFarlane | 1948 | Track and Field |
| Jack | Parry | 1948 | Track and Field |
| Rich | Ferguson | 1952 | Track and Field |
| George | Shepherd | 1960 | Track and Field |
| Grant | McLaren | 1972 | Track and Field |
| Grant | McLaren | 1976 | Track and Field |
| Wayne | Yetman | 1976 | Track and Field |
| Susan | (Bradley) Kameli | 1976 | Track and Field |
| Susan | (Bradley) Kameli | 1980 | Track and Field |
| Susan | (Bradley) Kameli | 1984 | Track and Field |
| Sharon | Lane | 1980 | Track and Field |
| Jeff | Glass | 1984 | Track and Field |
| Brigitte | (Bittner) Reid | 1984 | Track and Field |
| Sue | (French) Lee | 1984 | Track and Field |
| Sue | (French) Lee | 1988 | Track and Field |
| Lizanne | Bussieres | 1988 | Track and Field |
| Lizanne | Bussieres | 1992 | Track and Field |
| May | (Alizadeh) Allison | 1996 | Track and Field |
| Bruce | Deacon | 1996 | Track and Field |
| Bruce | Deacon | 2000 | Track and Field |
| Jessica | Zelinka | 2008 | Track and Field |
| Murray | McNie | 1936 | Track and Field (coach) |
| Murray | McNie | 1948 | Track and Field (coach) |
| Andy | McInnis | 1996 | Track and Field (coach) |
| John | Allan | 1996 | Track and Field (coach) |
| Vickie | Croley | 1996 | Track and Field (coach) |
| Kerry | Klosterman | 1976 | Volleyball |
| Erminia | Russo | 1996 | Volleyball |
| Cliff | Barry | 1972 | Water Polo |
| Cliff | Barry | 1976 | Water Polo |
| Peter | Michienzi | 1968 | Wrestling |
| Ole | Sorensen | 1972 | Wrestling |
| Egon | Beiler | 1972 | Wrestling |
| Egon | Beiler | 1976 | Wrestling |
| Egon | Beiler | 1980 | Wrestling |
| Mike | Barry | 1976 | Wrestling |
| Clive | Llewellyn | 1976 | Wrestling |
| Clive | Llewellyn | 1980 | Wrestling |
| Brian | Renken | 1976 | Wrestling |
| Brian | Renken | 1980 | Wrestling |
| Ray | Takahashi | 1976 | Wrestling |
| Ray | Takahashi | 1980 | Wrestling |
| Ray | Takahashi | 1984 | Wrestling |
| Bob | Robinson | 1980 | Wrestling |
| Sean | Barry | 1980 | Wrestling |
| Glynn | Leyshon | 1980 | Wrestling (coach) |
| Bob | Thayer | 1976 | Wrestling (coach) |
| Bob | Thayer | 1980 | Wrestling (coach) |
| Bill | Mitchell | 1988 | Westling (manager) |
| Harry | Geris | 1968 | Wrestling |
| Harry | Geris | 1972 | Wrestling |
| Harry | Geris | 1976 | Wrestling |
| Paul | Thomson | 1988 | Yachting |
| Paul | Thomson | 1992 | Yachting |
| Stuart | Bruce | 1992 | Yachting |
| Ken | Dool | 1992 | Yachting (coach) |
| Ken | Dool | 1996 | Yachting (coach) |
| Ken | Dool | 2000 | Yachting (coach) |
| Ken | Dool | 2004 | Yachting (coach) |
| J. Howard | Crocker | 1908 | Mission Staff |

=== Athletes of the Year ===
| Year | Female athlete | Sport | Male athlete | Sport |
|---|---|---|---|---|
| 2012–13 | Kelly Campbell | Ice hockey | Garrett May | Volleyball |
| 2013–14 | Jenny Vaughan | Basketball | Will Finch | Football |
| 2014–15 | Kelly Campbell | Ice hockey | Justin Scapinello | Volleyball |
| 2015–16 | Paulina Bond | Swimming | Riley Bell | Track & Field |
| 2016–17 | Kelsey Veltman | Volleyball | Jack Sheffar | Track & Field |
| 2017–18 | Larissa Werbicki | Rowing | Jean-Gabriel Poulin | Football |
| 2018–19 | April Clark | Ice hockey | Fraser Sopik | Football |
| 2019–20 | Kate Current | Cross Country | Sebastian Paulins | Swimming |
