= Paola López =

Argentine rower

Personal information
- Nationality: Argentine
- Born: 21 April 1974 (age 51)

Sport
- Sport: Rowing

Paola López (born 21 April 1974) is an Argentine rower. She competed in the women's single sculls event at the 2000 Summer Olympics.
