= Agnieszka Tomczak =

Polish rower

Personal information
- Full name: Agnieszka Magdalena Tomczak
- Born: 29 May 1975 (age 49); Bydgoszcz, Poland
- Height: 183 cm (6 ft 0 in)
- Weight: 85 kg (187 lb)

Sport
- Sport: Rowing
- Club: RTW Bydgostia Kabel

Agnieszka Magdalena Tomczak (born 29 May 1975 in Bydgoszcz) is a Polish rower. She completed in the women's single scull event in the 2000 Summer Olympics.
