= Paul Shorten =

American football wide receiver (born 1963)

No. 70
- Position: Wide receiver

Personal information
- Born: January 23, 1963 (age 63); Toronto, Ontario, Canada
- Listed height: 5 ft 10 in (1.78 m)
- Listed weight: 170 lb (77 kg)

Career information
- University: Toronto
- CFL draft: 1987: 2nd round, 18th overall pick

Career history
- 1987: BC Lions*
- 1987–1988: Toronto Argonauts*
- 1988–1989: Winnipeg Blue Bombers
- * Offseason or practice squad member only

Awards and highlights
- Grey Cup champion (1988); All-Canadian (1986); CIAU receiving yards leader (1986)

Paul Shorten (born January 23, 1963) is a Canadian former professional football wide receiver who played one season with the Winnipeg Blue Bombers of the Canadian Football League (CFL). He was selected by the BC Lions in the second round of the 1987 CFL draft. He played college football at the University of Toronto.

== Biography ==
Paul Shorten was born on January 23, 1963, in Toronto, Ontario.

=== University of Toronto (first stint) ===
Shorten attended the University of Toronto, and played college football for the Toronto Varsity Blues of the Canadian Intercollegiate Athletic Union (CIAU) as a slotback. He caught 33 passes for a CIAU-leading 676 yards during the 1986 season, earning All-Canadian honors.

=== BC Lions ===
Shorten was selected by the BC Lions of the Canadian Football League (CFL) in the second round, with the 18th overall pick, of the 1987 CFL draft. He officially signed with the team on May 26 for $34,000 plus a $2,000 signing bonus that would have doubled if he made the team. He was released on June 20. However, on June 22, it was reported that Shorten had been re-signed to the team's practice roster. On June 27, it was reported that he had been re-released by the Lions.

=== Toronto Argonauts and return to the University of Toronto ===
Shorten was then signed to the practice roster of the Toronto Argonauts of the CFL in mid July 1987. He was released by the Argonauts on August 21, 1987, so he could return to the University of Toronto for his final season of college football. Initially, the CIAU was not sure if Shorten still qualified as an amateur due to his stints on the practice rosters of both the Lions and Argonauts during the 1987 season. Nonetheless, the CIAU ended up letting him play the 1987 season. He returned to the Argonauts in 1988 but was released in July 1988 before the start of the 1988 CFL season. He was signed to the practice roster again shortly thereafter.

=== Winnipeg Blue Bombers ===
On July 17, 1988, it was reported that Shorten had been signed to the Winnipeg Blue Bombers' practice roster after being released from the Argonauts' practice roster the same day. He was promoted to the active roster several days later, replacing American wide receiver Ken Winey. Shorten dressed in 15 games for the Blue Bombers during the 1988 season, recording three catches for 34 yards, 24 punt returns for 88 yards, one kickoff return for 15 yards, and one tackle. He was released by the Blue Bombers on October 29 but signed back to the team's practice roster in early November. The Blue Bombers finished the year with a 9–9 record, second place in the CFL Eastern Division. Shorten replaced offensive guard Brad Tierney on the active roster for the team's Eastern Semi-Final game against the Hamilton Tiger-Cats. Shorten then played in the Eastern Final victory over the Toronto Argonauts. On November 27, 1988, Shorten split time on kick returns with teammate Ken Pettway as the Blue Bombers beat the BC Lions by a score of 22–21 to win the 76th Grey Cup. The next year, Shorten was placed on the injured list on July 1, 1989, with a finger injury. On August 7, 1989, it was reported that he had been released by the Blue Bombers.

=== Semi-pro football ===
Shorten then played semi-pro football for the Ottawa Bootleggers in 1989. He also later played for the Gateshead Senators in Britain and was inducted into the team's hall of fame in 2003.

=== University of Toronto (third stint) ===
In 1991, Shorten returned to the University of Toronto to earn more credits on his physical education degree with hopes of getting into teachers' college. Despite having already played professional football, Shorten played college football for the Toronto Varsity Blues during the 1991 season as both a cornerback and receiver. In one November game that year, he scored four receiving touchdowns.

=== Touch football ===
In 1995, Shorten played for the Toronto Landell Lightning at the Canadian touch football championships.
