= Mayra González =

Cuban rower

Personal information
- Born: 11 July 1968 (age 57)
Medal record
Women's rowing
Representing Cuba
Pan American Games
Gold medal – first place	2003 Santo Domingo	Single Sculls
Gold medal – first place	2007 Rio de Janeiro	Single Sculls

Mayra González Borroto (born 11 July 1968 in Sancti Spíritus) is a female rower from Cuba. She is a two-time Olympian (2000 and 2008) for her native country, and twice won a gold medal at the Pan American Games (2003 and 2007).
