= Kristen Wall =

Canadian rower

Personal information
- Nationality: Canadian
- Born: 2 June 1976 (age 49) Victoria, British Columbia, Canada

Sport
- Sport: Rowing

Kristen Wall (born 2 June 1976) is a Canadian rower. She competed in the women's single sculls event at the 2000 Summer Olympics.
