= Samia Hireche =

Algerian rower

Personal information
- Born: 26 August 1976 (age 48)
- Height: 1.73 m (5 ft 8 in)
- Weight: 63 kg (139 lb)

Sport
- Country: Algeria
- Sport: Rowing

Samia Hireche (born 26 August 1976) is an Algerian rower. She competed in the women's single sculls event at the 1996 Summer Olympics in Atlanta and the 2000 Summer Olympics in Sydney.
