= Forsyth Cup =

Canadian university volleyball championship

- Awarded for: OUA champion in U Sports men's volleyball
- First awarded: 1966
- Presented by: Ontario University Athletics
- Current champions: Queen's Gaels (2026)
- Most titles: Toronto Varsity Blues (15)

The Forsyth Cup is a Canadian university volleyball championship conducted by Ontario University Athletics (OUA) and determines the men's conference champion. The champion then qualifies for the U Sports men's volleyball championship, which typically takes place on the following weekend.

== History ==
The Ontario Universities Athletics Association volleyball championship was first contested following the 1965–66 season. The Toronto Varsity Blues won the first two championships in 1966 and 1967. After University of Toronto alumnus, Jim Forsyth, died in an automobile accident in February 1968, the Forsyth Memorial Trophy was donated in his honour and awarded to the OUAA conference champion.

From 2010 to 2020, the championship semi-finals and finals were played at the same site on the same weekend in single-game series. After the 2020–21 season and Forsyth Cup championship were cancelled due to the COVID-19 pandemic, the OUA announced that the semi-finals and finals would take place on different weekends for the 2021–22 season. The format was retained for the 2022–23 season onward, where the higher-seeded team would host the championship game.

== Champions ==
Year	Date	Champion	Score	Runner-up	Host city	Stadium (Host)	Attendance	Ref
1966		Toronto Varsity Blues					N/A	
1967		Toronto Varsity Blues					N/A	
1968		Western Mustangs					N/A	
1969		Western Mustangs					N/A	
1970		Montreal Carabins					N/A	
1971		Western Mustangs					N/A	
1972		Queen's Gaels					N/A	
1973		York Yeomen					N/A	
1974		York Yeomen					N/A	
1975		Waterloo Warriors					N/A	
1976		Western Mustangs					N/A	
1977		Laurentian Voyageurs					N/A	
1978		Guelph Gryphons					N/A	
1979		Western Mustangs					N/A	
1980		York Yeomen					N/A	
1981		York Yeomen					N/A	
1982		York Yeomen					N/A	
1983		Toronto Varsity Blues					N/A	
1984		Waterloo Warriors					N/A	
1985		Toronto Varsity Blues					N/A	
1986		Waterloo Warriors					N/A	
1987		Toronto Varsity Blues					N/A	
1988		Toronto Varsity Blues					N/A	
1989		York Yeomen		Waterloo Warriors			N/A	
1990		Waterloo Warriors					N/A	
1991		Toronto Varsity Blues		Waterloo Warriors			N/A	
1992		McMaster Marauders		Toronto Varsity Blues			N/A	
1993		York Yeomen		McMaster Marauders			N/A	
1994		York Yeomen		McMaster Marauders			N/A	
1995		Toronto Varsity Blues		Waterloo Warriors			N/A	
1996	February 23	Toronto Varsity Blues	3–1	Western Mustangs			N/A	
1997	February 28	Toronto Varsity Blues	3–0	Wilfrid Laurier Golden Hawks			N/A	
1998	February 20	Toronto Varsity Blues	3–0	Western Mustangs			N/A	
1999	February 19	Toronto Varsity Blues	3–1	Western Mustangs			N/A	
2000	February 26	Queen's Gaels	3–2	Western Mustangs			N/A	
2001	February 23	Toronto Varsity Blues		Western Mustangs			N/A	
2002		Queen's Gaels					N/A	
2003	February 19; February 21	Toronto Varsity Blues	2–0	Guelph Gryphons	Toronto; Guelph	Athletic Centre (Toronto); Athletics Centre (Guelph)	N/A	
2004	February 19; February 22	Toronto Varsity Blues	2–0	York Lions	Toronto	Athletic Centre (Toronto); Tait McKenzie Centre (York)	N/A	
2005	February 22; February 24; February 26	York Lions	2–1	Western Mustangs	Toronto; London; Toronto	Tait McKenzie Centre (York); Alumni Hall (Western); Tait McKenzie Centre (York)	N/A	
2006	February 21; February 23	Queen's Gaels	2–0	Ryerson Rams	Toronto; Kingston	Kerr Hall Gym (Ryerson); Bartlett Gym (Queen's)	N/A	
2007	February 20; February 22; February 24	Queen's Gaels	2–1	McMaster Marauders	Hamilton; Kingston	Burridge Gym (McMaster); Bartlett Gym (Queen's); Bartlett Gym (Queen's)	N/A	
2008	February 19; February 21	McMaster Marauders	2–0	Queen's Gaels	Kingston; Hamilton	Bartlett Gym (Queen's); Burridge Gym (McMaster)	N/A	
2009	February 17; February 19	McMaster Marauders	2–0	Queen's Gaels	Kingston; Hamilton	Bartlett Gym (Queen's); Burridge Gym (McMaster)	N/A	
2010	March 6	Queen's Gaels	3–2	Guelph Gryphons	Hamilton	Burridge Gym (McMaster)	N/A	
2011	February 26	McMaster Marauders	3–1	Western Mustangs	London	Alumni Hall (Western)	500	
2012	February 25	Queen's Gaels	3–2	Western Mustangs	London	Alumni Hall (Western)	N/A	
2013	February 23	McMaster Marauders	3–1	Western Mustangs	Hamilton	Burridge Gym (McMaster)	N/A	
2014	February 22	McMaster Marauders	3–1	Western Mustangs	Hamilton	Burridge Gym (McMaster)	N/A	
2015	February 21	McMaster Marauders	3–0	Waterloo Warriors	Hamilton	Burridge Gym (McMaster)	N/A	
2016	March 4	McMaster Marauders	3–0	Ryerson Rams	Hamilton	Burridge Gym (McMaster)	N/A	
2017	March 11	McMaster Marauders	3–2	Waterloo Warriors	Hamilton	Burridge Gym (McMaster)	N/A	
2018	March 10	McMaster Marauders	3–0	Queen's Gaels	Hamilton	Burridge Gym (McMaster)	1,000	
2019	March 10	Queen's Gaels	3–2	McMaster Marauders	Kingston	Athletics and Recreation Centre (Queen's)	1,800	
2020	March 7	Queen's Gaels	3–2	Toronto Varsity Blues	Hamilton	Burridge Gym (McMaster)	400	
2021	Cancelled due to the COVID-19 pandemic							
2022	March 19	McMaster Marauders	3–1	Toronto Varsity Blues	Hamilton	Burridge Gym (McMaster)	1,400	
2023	March 11	McMaster Marauders	3–0	Windsor Lancers	Hamilton	Burridge Gym (McMaster)	1,900	
2024	March 8	McMaster Marauders	3–2	Queen's Gaels	Hamilton	Burridge Gym (McMaster)	2,200	
2025	March 7	Queen's Gaels	3–1	Windsor Lancers	Windsor	Toldo Lancer Centre (Windsor)	2,280	
2026	March 6	Queen's Gaels	3–0	Windsor Lancers	Windsor	Toldo Lancer Centre (Windsor)	2,400	

== Results by schools ==
The following table includes all championship wins, as indicated above.

Team	Wins	Last
Toronto Varsity Blues	15	2004
McMaster Marauders	13	2024
Queen's Gaels	11	2026
York Lions/Yeomen	9	2005
Western Mustangs	5	1979
Waterloo Warriors	4	1990
Montreal Carabins	1	1970
Laurentian Voyageurs	1	1977
Guelph Gryphons	1	1978
