= Quigley Cup =

Canadian university volleyball championship

- Awarded for: OUA champion in U Sports women's volleyball
- First awarded: 1972
- Presented by: Ontario University Athletics
- Current champions: Brock Badgers (2026)
- Most titles: York Lions/Yeowomen (15)

The Quigley Cup is a Canadian university volleyball championship conducted by Ontario University Athletics (OUA), and determines the women's conference champion. The champion then qualifies for the U Sports women's volleyball championship, which typically takes place on the following weekend.

== History ==
The championship was first contested after the 1971–72 season following the creation of the Ontario Women's Interuniversity Athletic Association (OWIAA) in June 1971. The championship was renamed the Quigley Cup in February 2018, after Therese Quigley, who was a former volleyball player and coach as well as the director of athletics for McMaster University and the University of Western Ontario.

From 1997 to 2020, the championship semi-finals and finals were played at the same site on the same weekend. After the 2020–21 season and Quigley Cup championship were cancelled due to the COVID-19 pandemic, the OUA announced that the semi-finals and finals would take place on different weekends for the 2021–22 season. The format was retained for the 2022–23 season onward, where the higher-seeded team would host the championship game.

== Champions ==
Year	Date	Champion	Score	Runner-up	Host city	Stadium (Host)	Attendance	Ref
1972		Western Mustangs					N/A	
1973		Western Mustangs					N/A	
1974		Western Mustangs					N/A	
1975		Western Mustangs					N/A	
1976		Western Mustangs					N/A	
1977		Western Mustangs					N/A	
1978		Western Mustangs					N/A	
1979		York Yeowomen					N/A	
1980	February 23	Ottawa Gee-Gees	3–0	Western Mustangs	Ottawa	Montpetit Hall (Ottawa)	N/A	
1981	February 21	Ottawa Gee-Gees	3–1	York Yeowomen	Toronto	Tait McKenzie Centre (York)	N/A	
1982		York Yeowomen					N/A	
1983		York Yeowomen					N/A	
1984		York Yeowomen		Ottawa Gee-Gees			N/A	
1985		York Yeowomen		Ottawa Gee-Gees			N/A	
1986	March 1	Ottawa Gee-Gees	3–0	Toronto Varsity Blues	Hamilton	(McMaster)	N/A	
1987		York Yeowomen		Ottawa Gee-Gees			N/A	
1988		York Yeowomen					N/A	
1989		Toronto Varsity Blues		York Yeowomen			N/A	
1990		York Yeowomen		Ottawa Gee-Gees			N/A	
1991		York Yeowomen					N/A	
1992		York Yeowomen					N/A	
1993		York Yeowomen		Ottawa Gee-Gees			N/A	
1994		York Yeowomen					N/A	
1995	February 19	York Yeowomen	3–0	Toronto Varsity Blues	Ottawa	Montpetit Hall (Ottawa)	N/A	
1996		Toronto Varsity Blues		York Yeowomen	Hamilton	(McMaster)	N/A	
1997	February 23	York Yeowomen	3–1	Toronto Varsity Blues	Kingston	(Queen's)	N/A	
1998	February 22	Western Mustangs	3–0	Toronto Varsity Blues	London	Alumni Hall (Western)	N/A	
1999	February 28	Toronto Varsity Blues	3–2	York Yeowomen	Ottawa	Montpetit Hall (Ottawa)	N/A	
2000	February 27	Western Mustangs	3–0	Guelph Gryphons			N/A	
2001	February 24	Toronto Varsity Blues	3–1	Ottawa Gee-Gees			N/A	
2002	March 3	Toronto Varsity Blues	3–0	Ryerson Rams	Toronto	Athletic Centre (Toronto)	N/A	
2003	February 22	Toronto Varsity Blues	3–2	York Yeowomen	Guelph	Athletics Centre (Guelph)	N/A	
2004	February 28	Toronto Varsity Blues	3–0	Guelph Gryphons	Toronto	Athletic Centre (Toronto)	N/A	
2005	February 26	Western Mustangs	3–0	Wilfrid Laurier Golden Hawks	London	Alumni Hall (Western)	N/A	
2006	February 27	Windsor Lancers	3–0	Toronto Varsity Blues	Toronto	Athletic Centre (Toronto)	N/A	
2007	February 24	Ottawa Gee-Gees	3–0	McMaster Marauders	London	Alumni Hall (Western)	N/A	
2008	February 23	McMaster Marauders	3–1	Toronto Varsity Blues	Toronto	Athletic Centre (Toronto)	N/A	
2009	February 21	York Lions	3–0	McMaster Marauders	Toronto	Tait McKenzie Centre (York)	N/A	
2010	February 27	Toronto Varsity Blues	3–0	McMaster Marauders	Hamilton	Burridge Gym (McMaster)	N/A	
2011	February 26	Western Mustangs	3–1	Guelph Gryphons	Guelph	W.F. Mitchell Athletics Centre (Guelph)	N/A	
2012	February 26	Queen's Gaels	3–1	Ottawa Gee-Gees	Ottawa	Montpetit Hall (Ottawa)	N/A	
2013	February 23	Ottawa Gee-Gees	3–2	York Lions	Toronto	Tait McKenzie Centre (York)	N/A	
2014	February 23	McMaster Marauders	3–0	Ottawa Gee-Gees	Toronto	Athletic Centre (Toronto)	N/A	
2015	February 21	Toronto Varsity Blues	3–2	Ottawa Gee-Gees	Guelph	W.F. Mitchell Athletics Centre (Guelph)	150	
2016	March 5	Toronto Varsity Blues	3–0	Ryerson Rams	Toronto	Goldring Centre (Toronto)	1,400	
2017	March 11	McMaster Marauders	3–2	Western Mustangs	Toronto	Goldring Centre (Toronto)	1,200	
2018	March 10	Ryerson Rams	3–1	McMaster Marauders	Toronto	Mattamy Athletic Centre (Ryerson)	925	
2019	March 9	Toronto Varsity Blues	3–0	Ryerson Rams	Waterloo	Physical Activities Complex (Waterloo)	623	
2020	March 7	Toronto Varsity Blues	3–0	Brock Badgers	Toronto	Goldring Centre (Toronto)	200	
2021	Cancelled due to the COVID-19 pandemic							
2022	March 19	Brock Badgers	3–1	Toronto Varsity Blues	St. Catharines	Bob Davis Arena (Brock)	750	
2023	March 11	Brock Badgers	3–2	Queen's Gaels	St. Catharines	Bob Davis Arena (Brock)	750	
2024	March 8	Brock Badgers	3–1	McMaster Marauders	St. Catharines	Bob Davis Arena (Brock)	700	
2025	March 7	McMaster Marauders	3–0	Brock Badgers	St. Catharines	Bob Davis Arena (Brock)	800	
2026	March 6	Brock Badgers	3–1	McMaster Marauders	St. Catharines	Bob Davis Arena (Brock)	N/A	

== Results by schools ==
The following table includes all championship wins, as indicated above.

Team	Wins	Last
York Lions/Yeowomen	15	2009
Toronto Varsity Blues	12	2020
Western Mustangs	11	2011
Ottawa Gee-Gees	5	2013
McMaster Marauders	4	2025
Brock Badgers	4	2026
Windsor Lancers	1	2006
Queen's Gaels	1	2012
Ryerson Rams	1	2018
