= York Lions =

Sports teams of York University in Toronto

- University: York University
- Nickname: Lions
- Association: U Sports
- Conference: Ontario University Athletics
- Athletic director: Steven Chuang, Executive Director of Athletics & Recreation / York Lions Athletic Director
- Location: Toronto, Ontario
- Varsity teams: 19 (9 men's, 10 women's)
- Football stadium: York Lions Stadium
- Basketball arena: Tait McKenzie Centre
- Ice hockey arena: NFP Athletic Centre
- Soccer stadium: York Lions Stadium
- Tennis venue: Sobeys Stadium
- Outdoor track and field venue: Toronto Track and Field Centre
- Volleyball arena: Tait McKenzie Centre
- Field hockey venue: Alumni Field
- Rugby venue: Alumni Field
- Colours: Red, White, and Black
- Mascot: Lion
- Website: yorkulions.ca
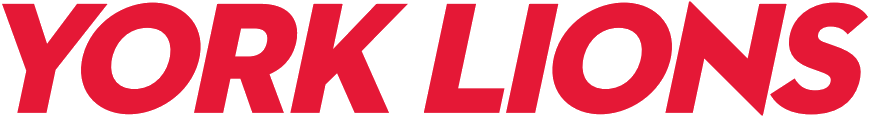

The York Lions is the official name for the athletic varsity teams that represent York University in Toronto, Ontario, Canada. The university's varsity teams compete in the Ontario University Athletics conference of U Sports and, where applicable, in the east division. The Lions' logo features a red lion from the school's logo with the university's colours, red and white.

York's former teams were known as the York Yeomen and York Yeowomen, but changed their name to the gender-neutral Lions in 2003.

== Varsity teams ==
Men's sports	Women's sports
Basketball	Basketball
Cross Country	Cross Country
Football	Field hockey
Ice Hockey	Ice Hockey
Soccer	Rugby
Tennis	Soccer
Track and field	Tennis
Volleyball	Track and field
Wrestling	Volleyball
	Wrestling

=== Football ===
The York Lions football team has been in operation since 1968 and currently compete in the 11-team Ontario University Athletics conference. The program is one of two in U Sports football to have never won a conference championship. Dexter Janke has been the team's head coach since January 22, 2024.

=== Men's ice hockey ===
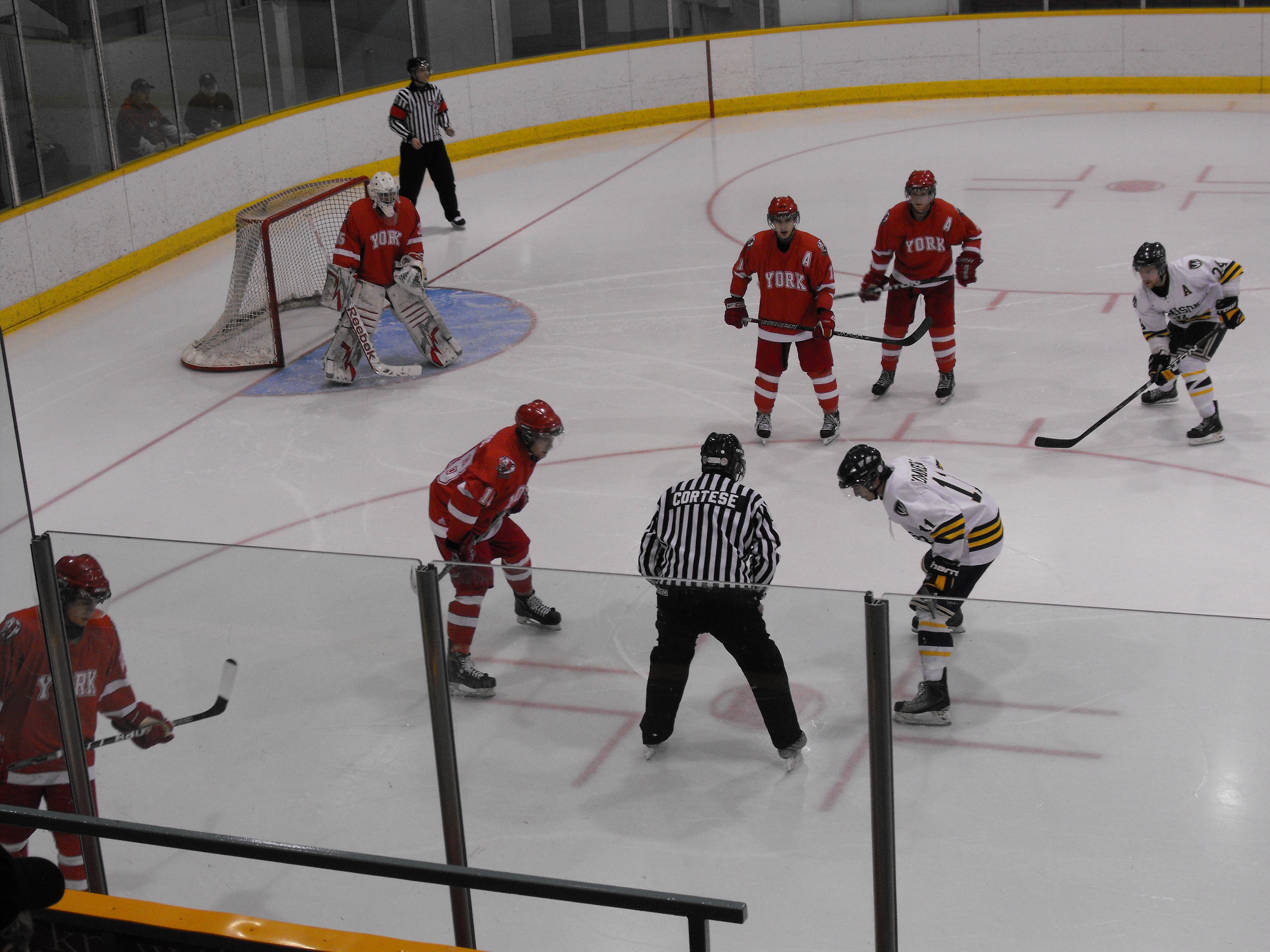
Men's hockey road playoff game vs. Windsor Lancers February 16, 2012.

The York Lions men's ice hockey team competes in the 20-team Ontario University Athletics conference. The team has won three national championships in 1985, 1988, and 1989. The program has also yielded seven Queen's Cup conference championships, most recently in 2017. The team's head coach has been Russ Herrington since 2017.

=== Women's ice hockey ===
The York Lions women's ice hockey team competes in the 13-team Ontario University Athletics conference. The team's head coach is Dan Church, who has been in that position since 2004 and is the longest-serving active head coach at York. The team was won three McCaw Cup conference championships, coming in 1983, 1987, and 1997.

=== Men's soccer ===
The York Lions men's soccer team has won six U Sports national championships and seven OUA conference championships. Since the hiring of head coach Carmine Isacco in 2007, the Lions have won six of these conference championships (2007, 2013, 2014, 2015, 2017, 2018) and five national championships (2008, 2010, 2014, 2015, 2025). The Lions' 2008 U Sports championship was York's first national championship in any sport in 18 years, and their first soccer championship since 1977. Playing for the Lions, in 2010 Alon Badat was named a U Sports Championship All Star, and the Ontario University Athletics (OUA) West Rookie of the Year, and in 2011 he was a First-Team OUA All-Star. The team currently competes in the 18-team Ontario University Athletics conference.

=== Women's soccer ===
The York Lions women's soccer team currently competes in the 19-team Ontario University Athletics conference. The program has had four conference championship winners, coming in 2005, 2007, 2009, and 2019. Carmine Isacco has been the team's head coach since 2012.

=== Men's volleyball ===
The York Lions men's volleyball team currently competes in the 13-team Ontario University Athletics conference. The program has featured 13 conference championship winners, most recently in 2005. The highest that the team has finished in the national championship tournament was a second-place finish in 1974. Jordan Taylor was named the team's head coach on July 21, 2023.

=== Women's volleyball ===
The York Lions women's volleyball team currently competes in the 14-team Ontario University Athletics conference. The program has had a school-record 15 conference championships with the most recent occurring 2009. In the national championship tournament, the Lions have won five bronze medals, most recently in 1991. The team has been led by head coach Jennifer Neilson since 2018.

== Championships ==
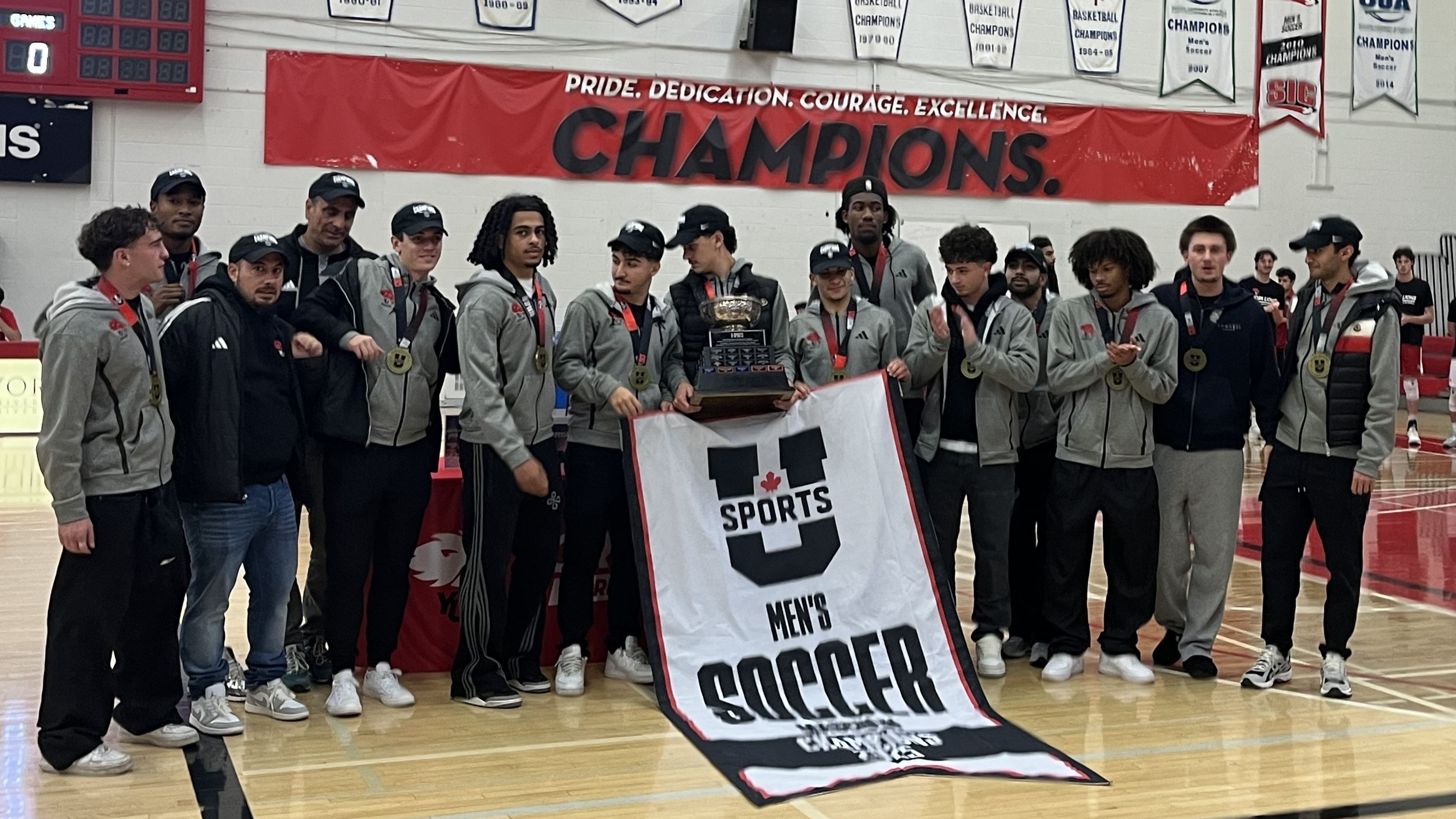
The Lions Men's soccer team celebrates their 2025 championship.

=== National championships ===
As of December 2025, York Lions teams and athletes have won 39 national championships.

- Men's (28)
  - Gymnastics (15): 1971, 1973, 1975–1987
  - Ice hockey (3): 1985, 1988, 1989
  - Indoor Track & Field (3): 1983, 1984, 2014
  - Soccer (6): 1977, 2008, 2010, 2014, 2015, 2025
  - Wrestling (1): 1989
- Women's (11)
  - Field hockey (1): 2025
  - Gymnastics (5): 1971, 1974, 1976, 1980, 1984
  - Indoor Track & Field (3): 1984, 1988, 1990
  - Tennis (2): 2015, 2016

=== Conference championships ===
- Men's
  - Badminton (3): 1968, 1970, 1983
  - Basketball (7): 1978–1982, 1984, 1985
  - Cross Country (4): 1967–1970
  - Curling (3): 1981, 1982, 1986
  - Fencing (1): 1970
  - Golf (1): 1979
  - Gymnastics (19): 1972–1985, 1988–1992
  - Ice Hockey (7): 1970, 1985–1988, 2004, 2017
  - Rugby (3): 1973, 1976, 1984
  - Soccer (7): 1977, 2007, 2013–2015, 2017, 2018
  - Skiing (1): 1970
  - Squash (2): 1970, 1971
  - Swimming (2): 1968, 1969
  - Table Tennis (1): 1971
  - Tennis (11): 1968–1970, 1975, 1978, 1991, 1994, 1996, 2005, 2007, 2009
  - Volleyball (13): 1968–1971, 1973, 1974, 1980–1982, 1989, 1993, 1994, 2005
  - Water Polo (4): 1981, 1997, 1999, 2000
  - Wrestling (2): 1987, 1989
- Women's
  - Badminton (1): 1968
  - Basketball (2): 1982, 2007
  - Field Hockey (11): 1980, 1981, 1984, 1990, 1993, 1994, 1996, 2017, 2018, 2022, 2025
  - Figure Skating (2): 1984, 1990
  - Ice Hockey (3): 1983, 1987, 1997
  - Indoor Hockey (8): 1990–1993, 1995, 1998, 1999, 2005
  - Gymnastics (17): 1969–1979, 1984, 1987, 1989, 1990–1992
  - Soccer (4): 2005, 2007, 2009, 2019
  - Squash (4): 1977, 1978, 1981, 1983
  - Synchronized Swimming (6): 1968–1970, 1986, 1988, 1989
  - Track & Field (2): 1988, 1990
  - Tennis (8): 1968, 1969, 1982, 1995, 2001–2003, 2014
  - Volleyball (15): 1979, 1982–1985, 1987, 1988, 1990–1995, 1997, 2009
  - Water Polo (5): 1996, 1997, 1999, 2000, 2002

== Facilities ==
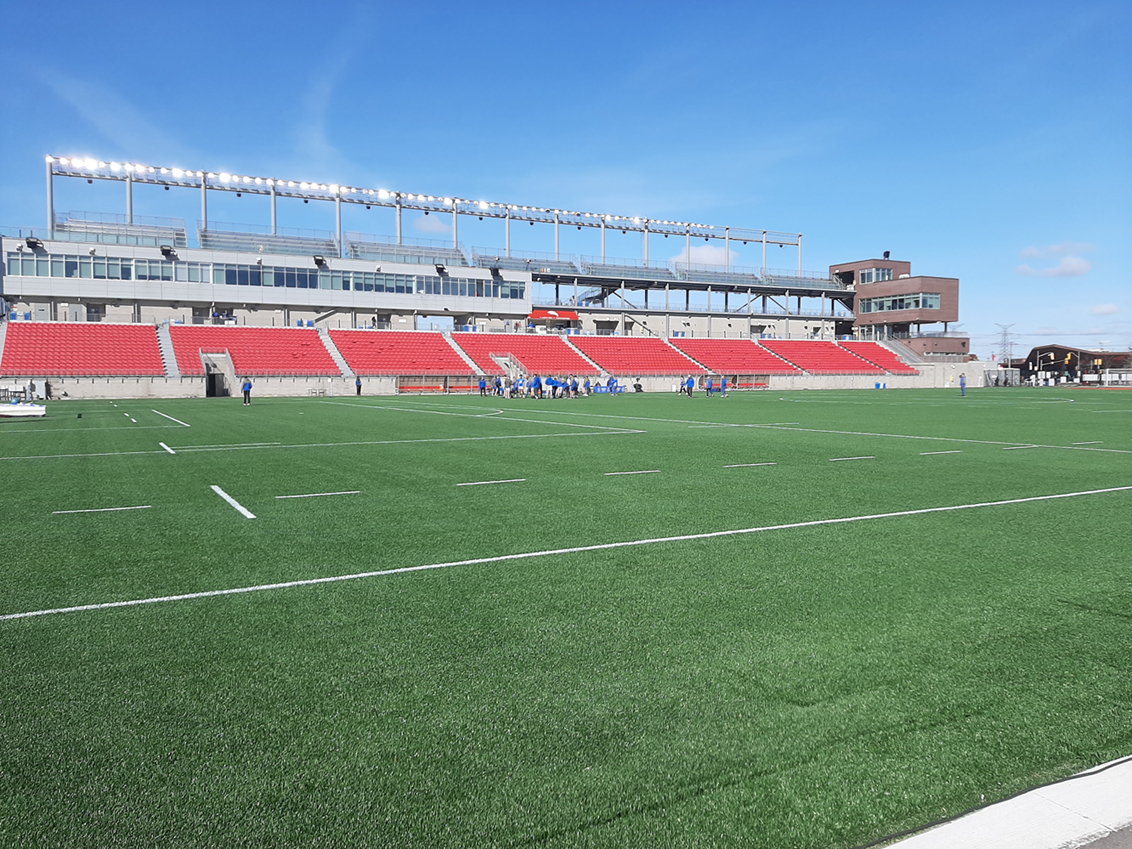
York Lions Stadium

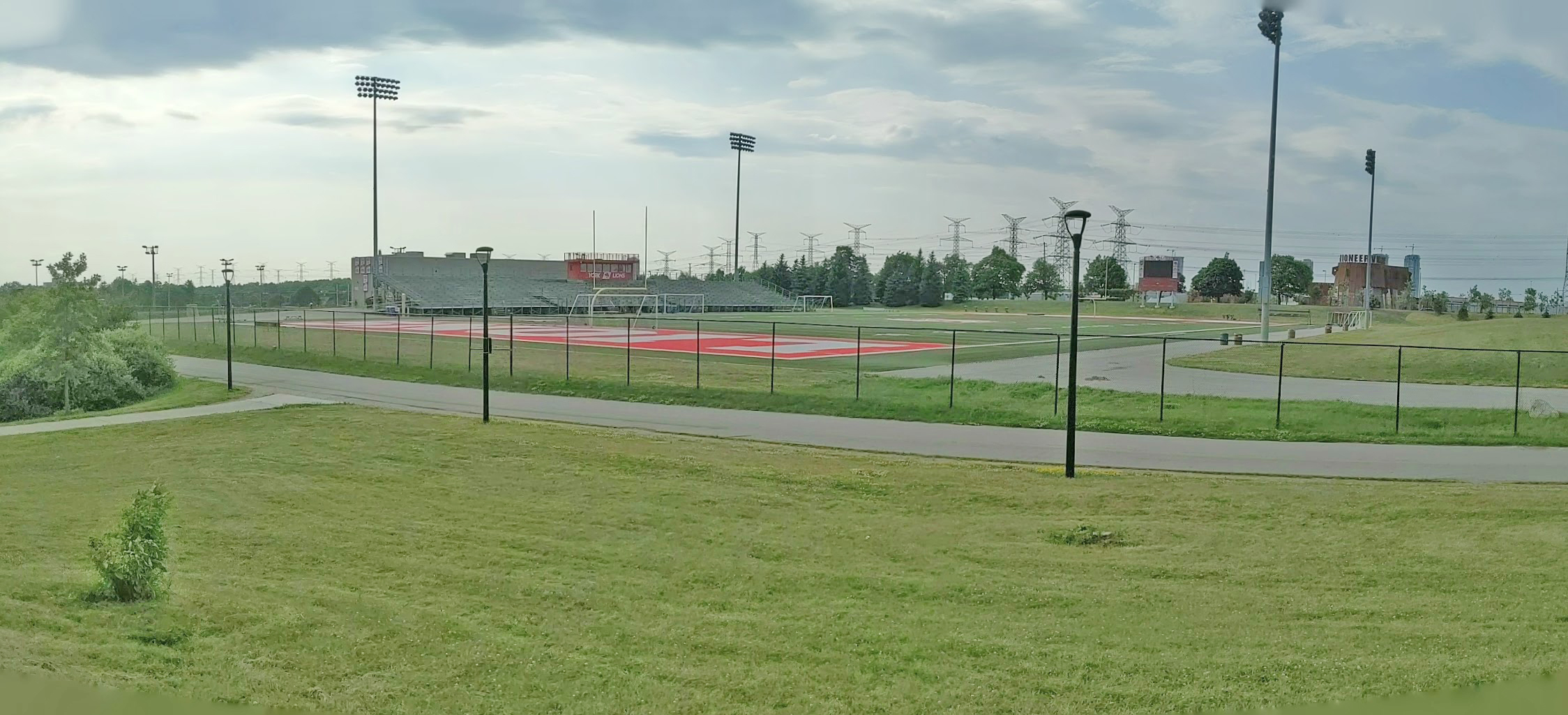
Alumni Field

Venue	Sport(s)	Ref.
York Lions Stadium	Football; Soccer	
Alumni Field	Field hockey Rugby	
Tait McKenzie Centre	Basketball; Volleyball; Wrestling	
Canlan Sports (Note: Not owned by the university.)	Ice hockey	
Mayfair Clubs	Tennis	
Toronto Track and Field Centre	Track and field	

== International competition ==
This is an incomplete list

- Kelsey Webster, Ice Hockey, 2009 Winter Universiade, (gold)
- Courtney Unruh, Ice Hockey, 2011 Winter Universiade, (gold)
- Kelsey Webster, Ice Hockey, 2011 Winter Universiade, (gold)
- Kiri Langford, Ice Hockey, 2011 Women's World Ice Hockey Championships – Division IV, (gold)
- Autumn Mills: Baseball, 2015 Pan American Games, (silver)
- Brittany Crew, Track and Field, 2017 Summer Universiade (Won gold with a best throw of 18.34 meters) (gold)
- Melissa Humana-Paredes, Volleyball, 2018 Commonwealth Games (gold) , 2019 Beach Volleyball World Championships (gold)

== Awards and honours ==
=== Athletes of the Year ===
This is an incomplete list

Year	Female Athlete	Sport	Male Athlete	Sport	Ref.
2009–10	Heather Hamilton	Track & Field	Tyrone Halstead	Track & Field	
2010–11	Effie Petrou	Field Hockey	Adrian Pena	Soccer	
2011–12	Melissa Humana-Paredes	Volleyball	Dontae Richards-Kwok	Track & Field	
2012–13	Cynthia Appiah	Track & Field	David McKay	Track & Field	
2013–14	Khamica Bingham	Track & Field	Dontae Richards-Kwok	Track & Field	
2014–15	Brittany Crew	Track & Field	Jarek Whiteman	Soccer	
2015–16	Brittany Crew	Track & Field	Michael Cox	Soccer	
2016–17	Holly Pitters	Track & Field	Jonathan Lao	Soccer	
2017–18	Holly Pitters	Track & Field	Kayden Johnson	Track & Field; Football	
2018–19	Brittany Crew	Track & Field	Pierce Lepage	Track & Field	
2019–20	Teni Odetoyinbo	Soccer	Daniel Gleason	Track & Field	
2020–21	Not awarded due to the COVID-19 pandemic.				
2021–22	Leah Jones	Track & Field	Dieu Merci Yuma	Soccer	
2022–23	Jotam Chouhan	Soccer	Soji Olatoye	Soccer	
2023–24	Kaitlin Brooks	Track & Field	Christian Zeppieri	Soccer	
2024–25	Nia Fleming-Thompson	Soccer	Christian Zeppieri	Soccer	
