= York Lions Stadium =

Outdoor sports venue in Toronto, Ontario

Coordinates: 43.775°N 79.507°W

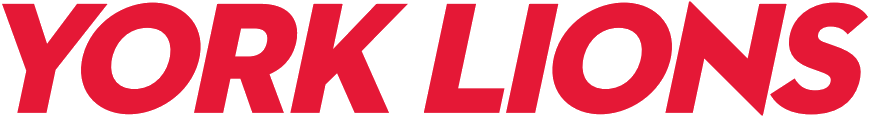

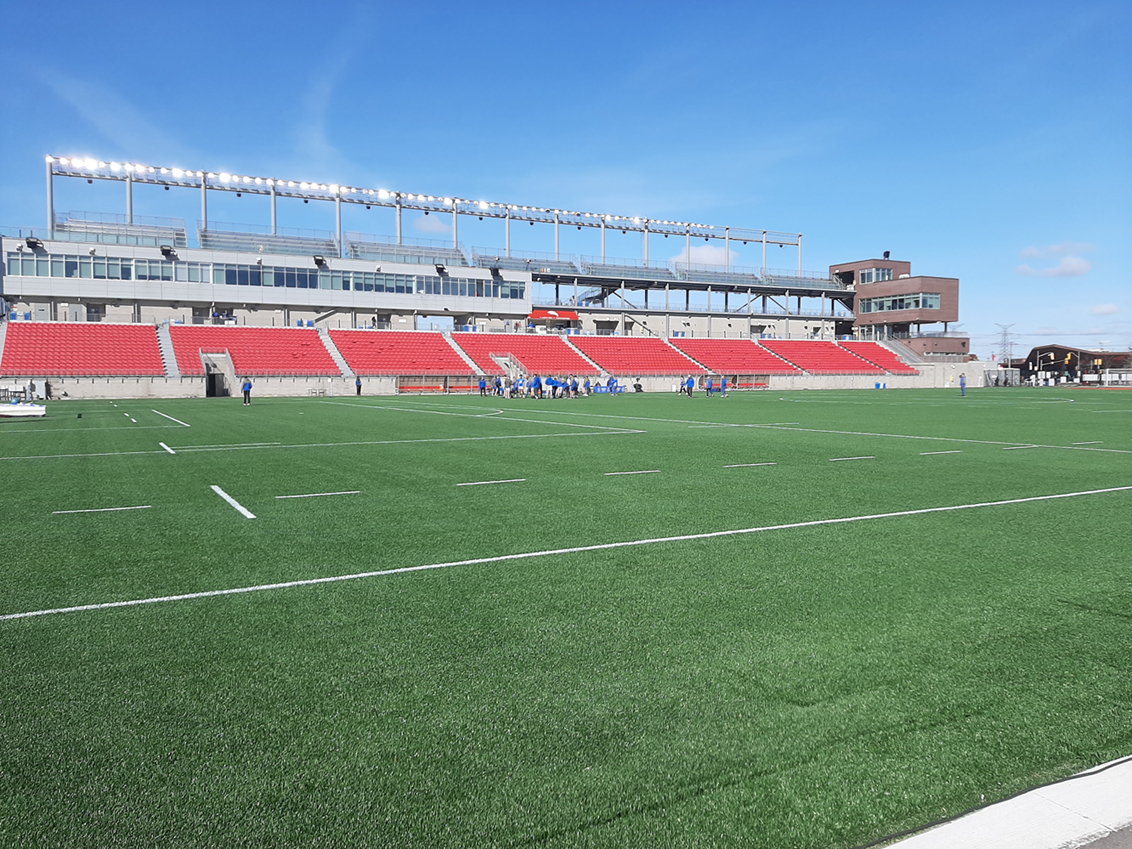
- The stadium in 2022

- Location in Toronto Location in Ontario Location in Canada
- Former names: CIBC Pan Am and Parapan Am Athletics Stadium
- Address: North York, Toronto, Ontario; Canada
- Owner: York University
- Operator: York University
- Capacity: 4,000 (seated)
- Type: Stadium
- Surface: Artificial turf
- Field size: 450 by 250 feet (137 m × 76 m); 105 by 65 metres (115 yd × 71 yd) (soccer)
- Current use: Football; Soccer
- Public transit: Pioneer Village; YRT Pioneer Village Terminal

Construction
- Built: 2012–2014
- Opened: 2015; 11 years ago
- Architect: CannonDesign

Tenants
- York Lions (U Sports) teams: football, soccer (2015–present); AFC Toronto (NSL) (2025–present); Toronto FC II (MLSNP) (2022–present); Inter Toronto FC (CPL) (2019–present); Toronto Arrows (MLR) (2022–23)

Website
- yorkulions.ca/york-lions-stadium

York Lions Stadium is an outdoor sports stadium on the Keele Campus of York University in the North York district of Toronto. It is home to the York Lions, the varsity teams of York University; Toronto FC II of MLS Next Pro, the reserve team of Toronto FC; Inter Toronto FC of the Canadian Premier League; and AFC Toronto of the Northern Super League. The facility was primarily built for the 2015 Pan American and Parapan American Games, where it hosted track and field events and the opening ceremony. In 2021, the stadium's running track was removed to expand the playing surface used for football and soccer.

== History ==
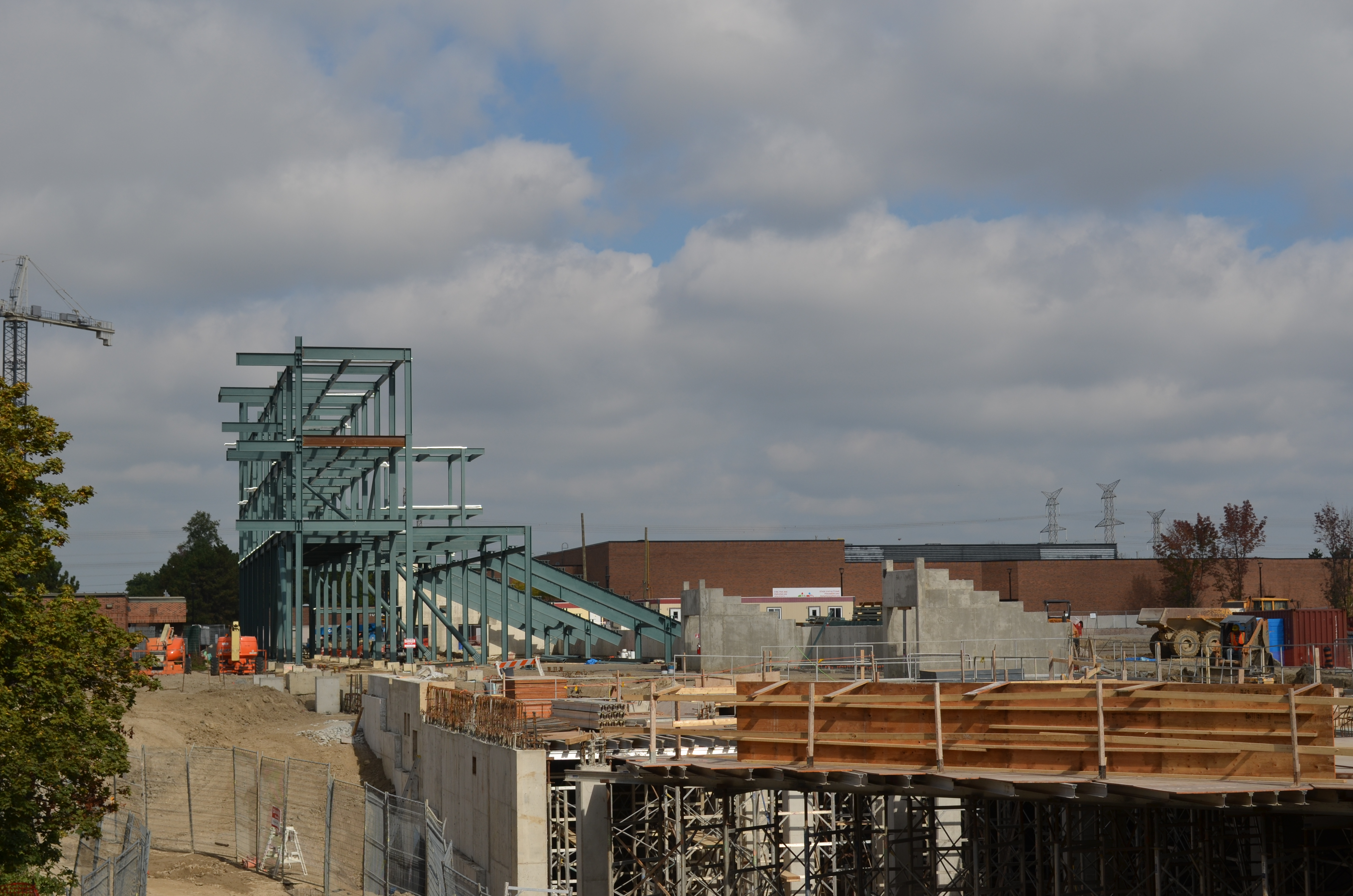
York Lions Stadium under construction in September 2013

Initial plans had a multi-purpose athletics and soccer stadium to be built somewhere in the vicinity of Hamilton, Ontario; however, the final plans separated the soccer and athletics venues. The soccer stadium, Tim Hortons Field, was built on the site of Ivor Wynne Stadium, while the athletics stadium was built at York University. During the games the venue was known as the CIBC Pan Am and Parapan Am Athletics Stadium.

The stadium was expected to seat approximately 5,000 spectators – 3,000 permanent and 2,000 temporary. During the games an additional 7,500 temporary seats were added, bringing total capacity to 12,500. The facility cost roughly $45.5 million, with $34.9 million attributed to the design and construction with the rest for running costs.

On May 26, 2016, it was announced that the stadium would play host to the 2017 North American Indigenous Games. The stadium will be the site of the opening and closing ceremonies as well as the athletics competitions in July 2017. In the same year, the stadium was also used as an event facility for the Invictus Games.

In early 2021, the stadium's track and grass field was replaced with a larger FIFA and World Rugby certified artificial turf surface. The renovations also allow for the playing surface to be covered with an air-supported dome during winter months.

== Professional sports ==
The Toronto Arrows, a professional rugby union club which joined Major League Rugby in 2019, played exhibition games in 2018 at York Lions Stadium. However, during its inaugural 2019 MLR season the team split its home games between Alumni Field and Lamport Stadium. They hosted their games at York Lions Stadium from 2022 to 2023, before the team ceased operations.

Inter Toronto FC, a soccer team in the Canadian Premier League, has played their home games at York Lions Stadium since their inaugural season in 2019, when they were known as York9 FC.

Toronto FC II, a soccer team in MLS Next Pro, began playing their home games at York Lions Stadium in 2022. On July 14, 2026, it was announced the team would be relocated to Barrie for the 2028–29 season, to play at a new stadium to be constructed in the city.

AFC Toronto, a soccer team in the Northern Super League, began playing their home games at York Lions Stadium in 2025

== Major competitions hosted ==
| Year | Date | Event | Level |
|---|---|---|---|
| 2015 | July 18–26 | 2015 Pan American Games | International |
| 2015 | August 7–15 | 2015 Parapan American Games | International |
| 2017 | July 16–23 | 2017 North American Indigenous Games | Continental |
| 2017 | September 23–30 | 2017 Invictus Games | International |
| 2019 | July 18–21 | 2019 NCCWMA Masters Athletics Championships | Continental |

== Gallery ==
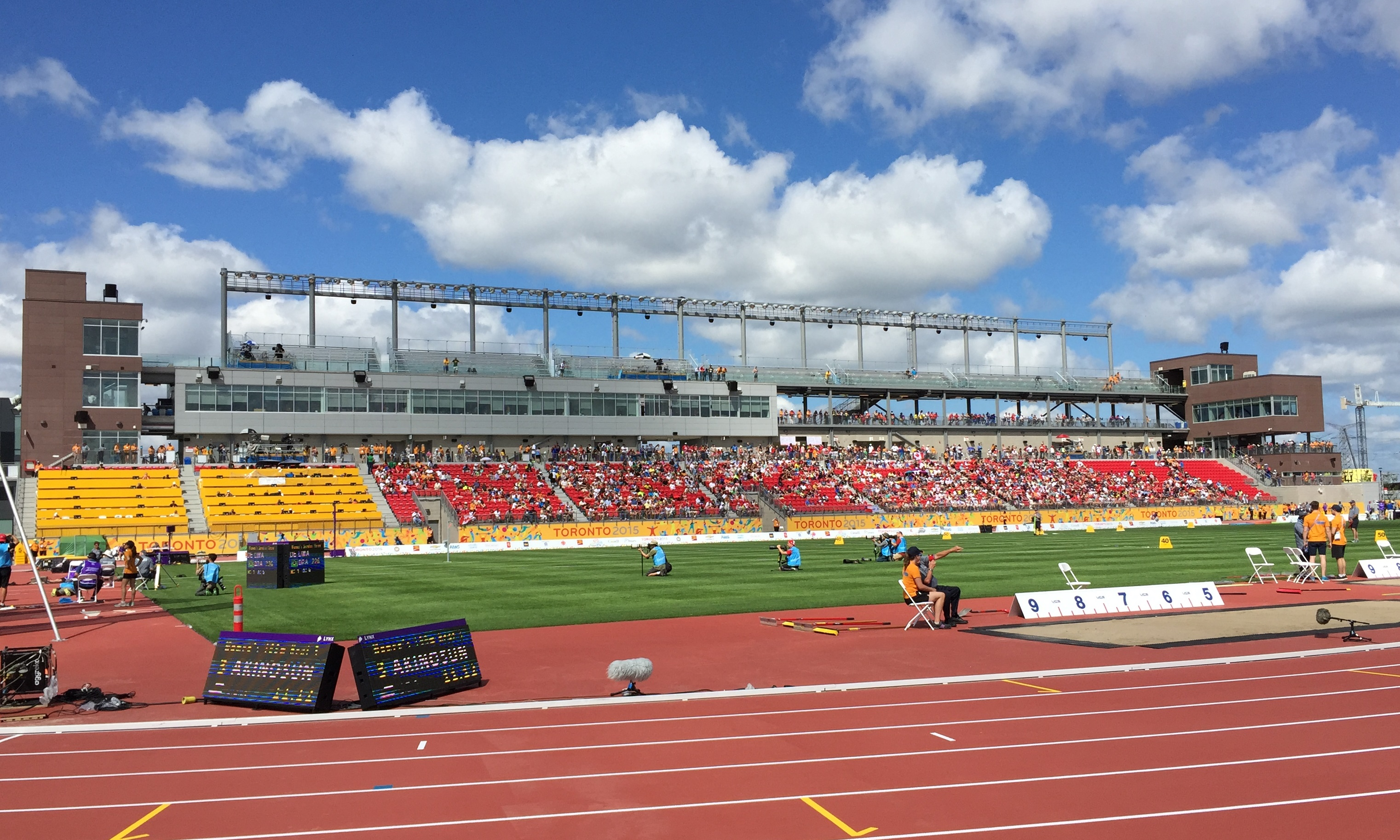
The stadium in 2015

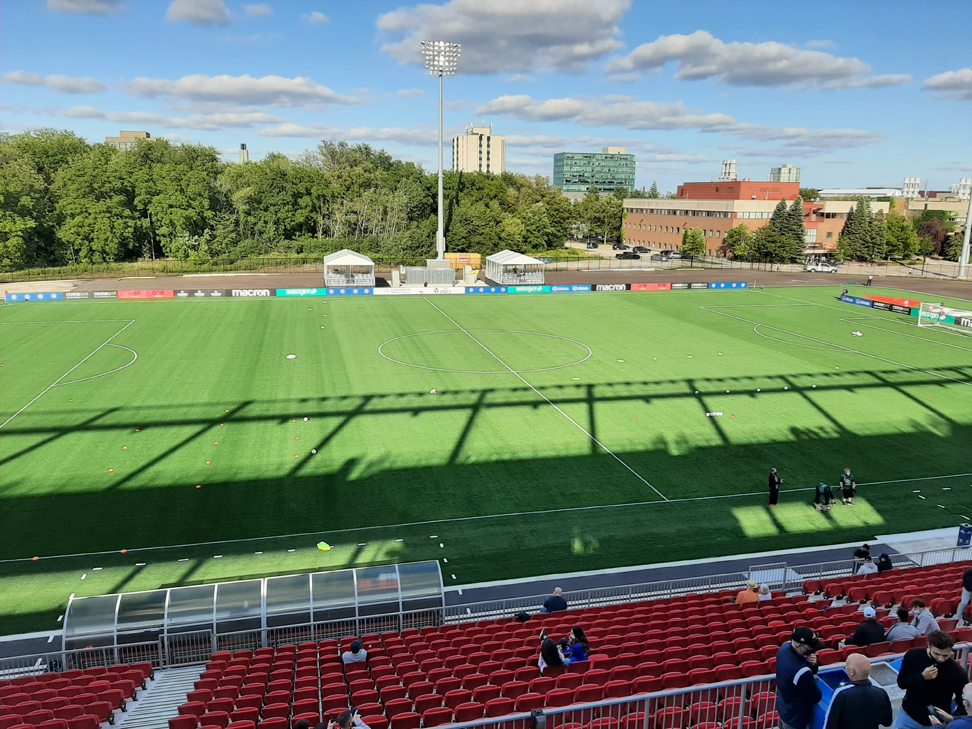
The stadium in 2021

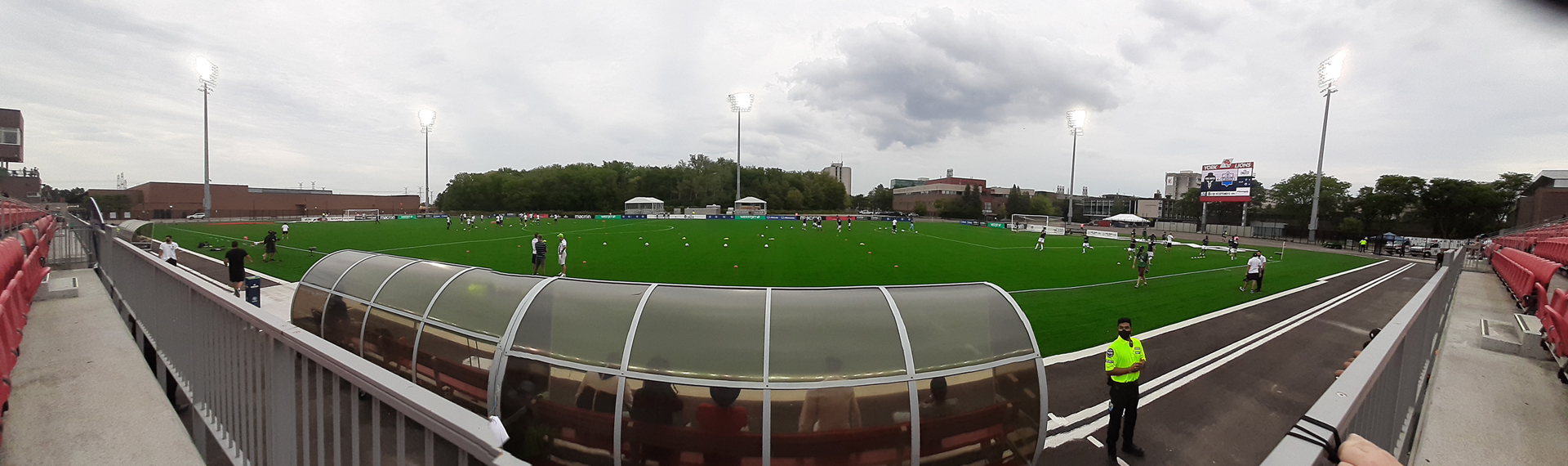
A panoramic of the stadium in 2021

== See also ==
- List of Canadian Premier League stadiums
- Venues of the 2015 Pan American and Parapan American Games
- Birchmount Stadium – City of Toronto / Toronto District School Board
- Centennial Park Stadium – City of Toronto
- Esther Shiner Stadium – City of Toronto
- Lamport Stadium – City of Toronto
- Monarch Park Stadium – Toronto District School Board
- Metro Toronto Track and Field Centre – City of Toronto
- Rosedale Field – City of Toronto
- Varsity Stadium – University of Toronto
