= 2017 North American Indigenous Games =

X North American Indigenous Games
- Host city: Toronto, Ontario, Canada
- Athletes: 4,261
- Opening: 16 July
- Closing: 22 July
- Main venue: Aviva Centre

The 2017 North American Indigenous Games were held in Toronto, Ontario, Canada July 16 to 23. The event featured 5,000 athletes aged 13 to 19 in 14 sports.

== Bidding process ==
The 2017 North American Indigenous Games bidding process began on January 12, 2015 and Toronto submitted its bid on January 30, 2015. The bid to host the Games in Toronto, led by the Aboriginal Sport & Wellness Council of Ontario and the Mississaugas of New Credit First Nation, received unanimous support from the NAIG's International Governing Body. The Games was awarded to Toronto on June 26, 2015 after bids from other cities did not materialize.

== Funding ==
The total budget for the Games was $11 million. Three levels of government provided funding to the 2017 North American Indigenous Games. Government of Canada provided $3.5 million through Sport Canada and Government of Ontario provided $3.5 million in matching funding. City of Toronto contributed $400,000 funding. Other major sponsors included Hydro One, Rogers Communication and Unifor.

== Broadcasting rights ==
CBC provided 100 hours of live and on-demand streaming for competitions and opening ceremony. Indigenous groups and academia called the absence of live TV coverage due to lack of funding as "unfortunate".

== Venues ==
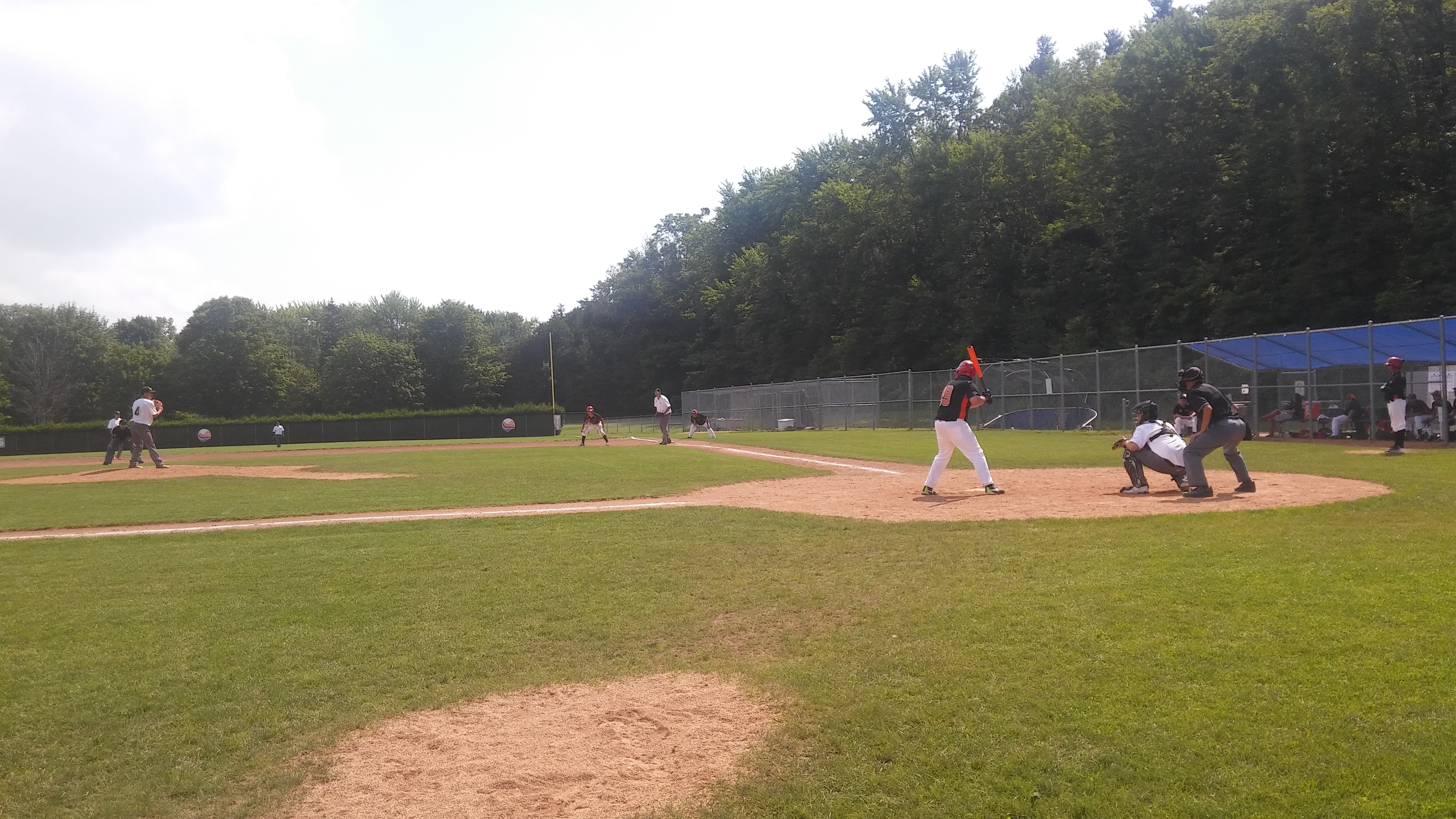
Under-17 male baseball between Eastern Door & the North (Quebec) and Saskatchewan at Dan Lang Field in University of Toronto Scarborough, Toronto

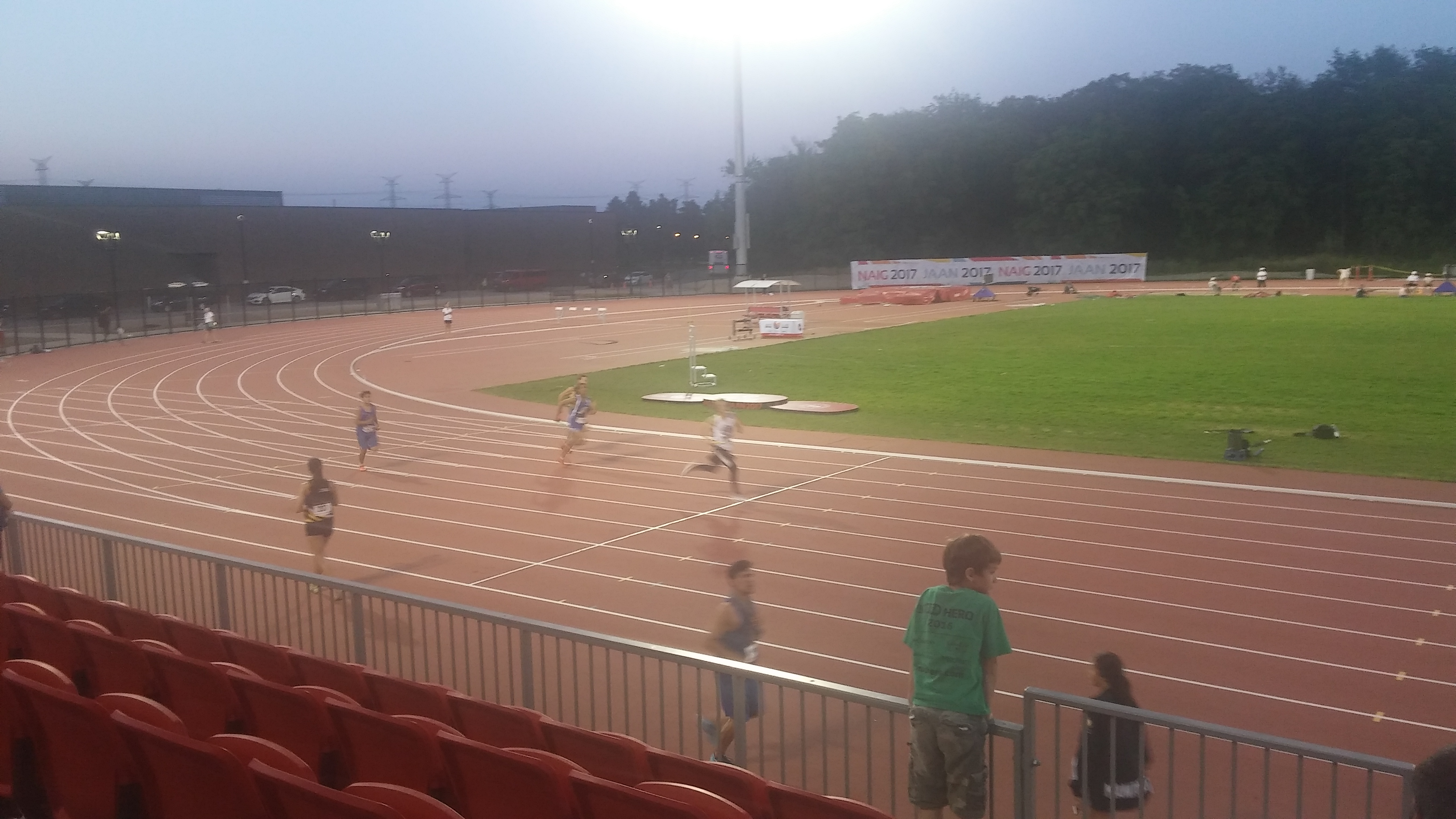
Track & field competition at York Lions Stadium in Toronto

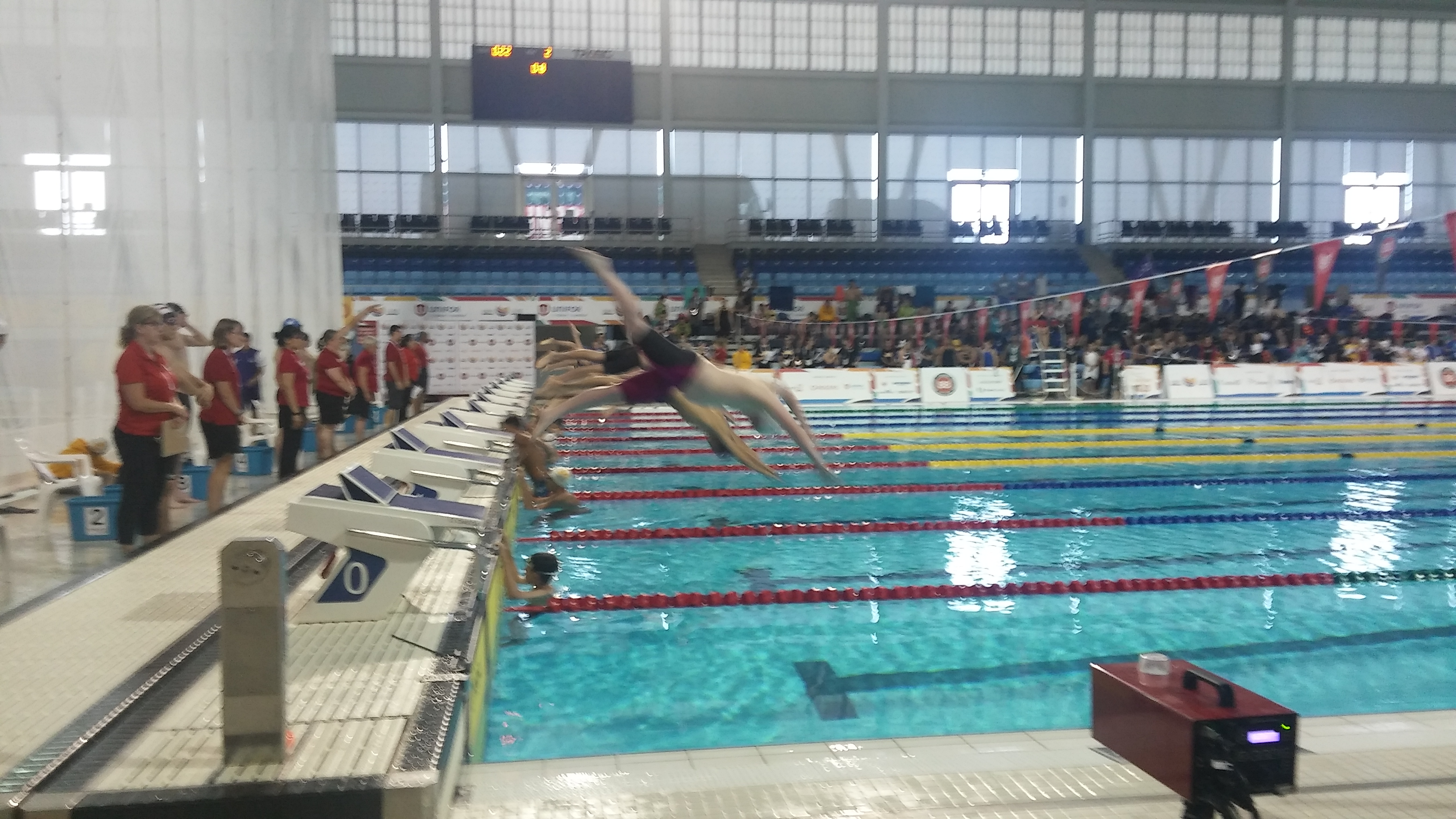
Swimming competition at Toronto Pan Am Sports Centre, Toronto

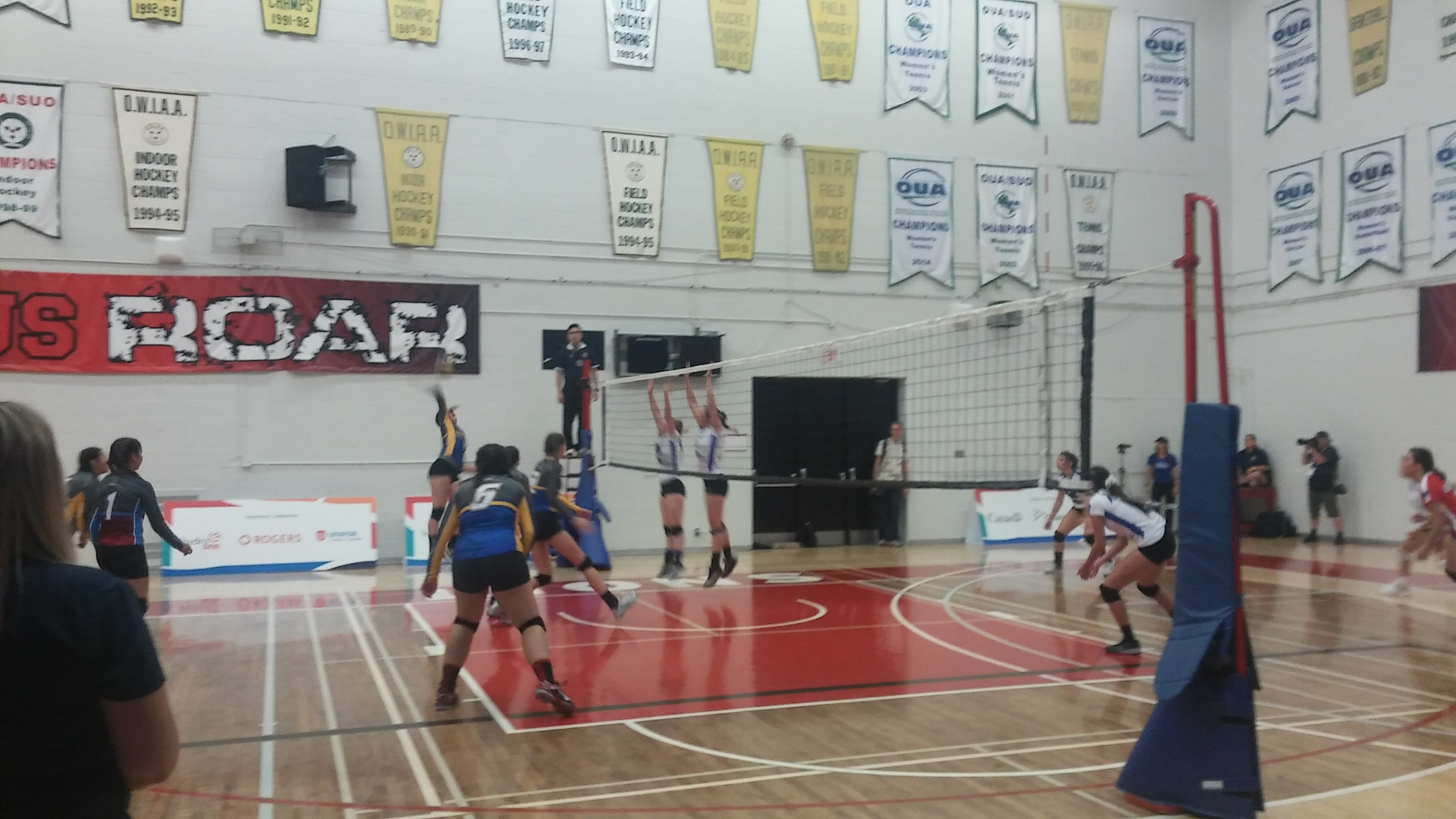
Under-19 female volleyball bronze medal match at Tait Mackenzie Centre, Toronto

- Aviva Centre - North York, Toronto (Opening ceremony)
- Dan Lang Field - Scarborough, Toronto (Baseball)
- Gaylord Powless Arena - Ohsweken, Ontario (Lacrosse)
- Hamilton Angling & Hunting Association - Ancaster, Ontario (3-D Archery)
- Harry Howell Arena - Waterdown, Ontario (Lacrosse)
- HoopDome - North York, Toronto (Basketball)
- Humber Athletics & Recreation Centre - Etobicoke, Toronto (Basketball, Volleyball)
- Humber Valley Golf Course - Etobicoke, Toronto (Golf)
- Iroquois Lacrosse Arena - Hagersville, Ontario (Lacrosse)
- Ron Joyce Stadium - Hamilton, Ontario (Soccer)
- Tait McKenzie Centre - North York, Toronto (Basketball, Volleyball)
- Toronto International Trap & Skeet Club - Cookstown, Ontario (Rifle shooting)
- Toronto Pan Am Sports Centre - Scarborough, Toronto (Badminton, Swimming)
- Toronto Track & Field Centre - North York, Toronto (Wrestling)
- Turner Park - Hamilton, Ontario (Softball)
- University of Toronto Scarborough Valley - Scarborough, Toronto (Cross Country)
- Welland International Flatwater Centre - Welland, Ontario (Canoe/Kayak)
- York Lions Stadium - North York, Toronto (Athletics)
- York University - North York, Toronto (Closing ceremony)

== Sports ==
- 3D Archery
- Athletics
- Badminton
- Baseball
- Basketball
- Canoe/Kayak
- Golf
- Lacrosse
- Rifle shooting
- Soccer
- Softball
- Swimming
- Volleyball
- Wrestling

=== Calendar ===
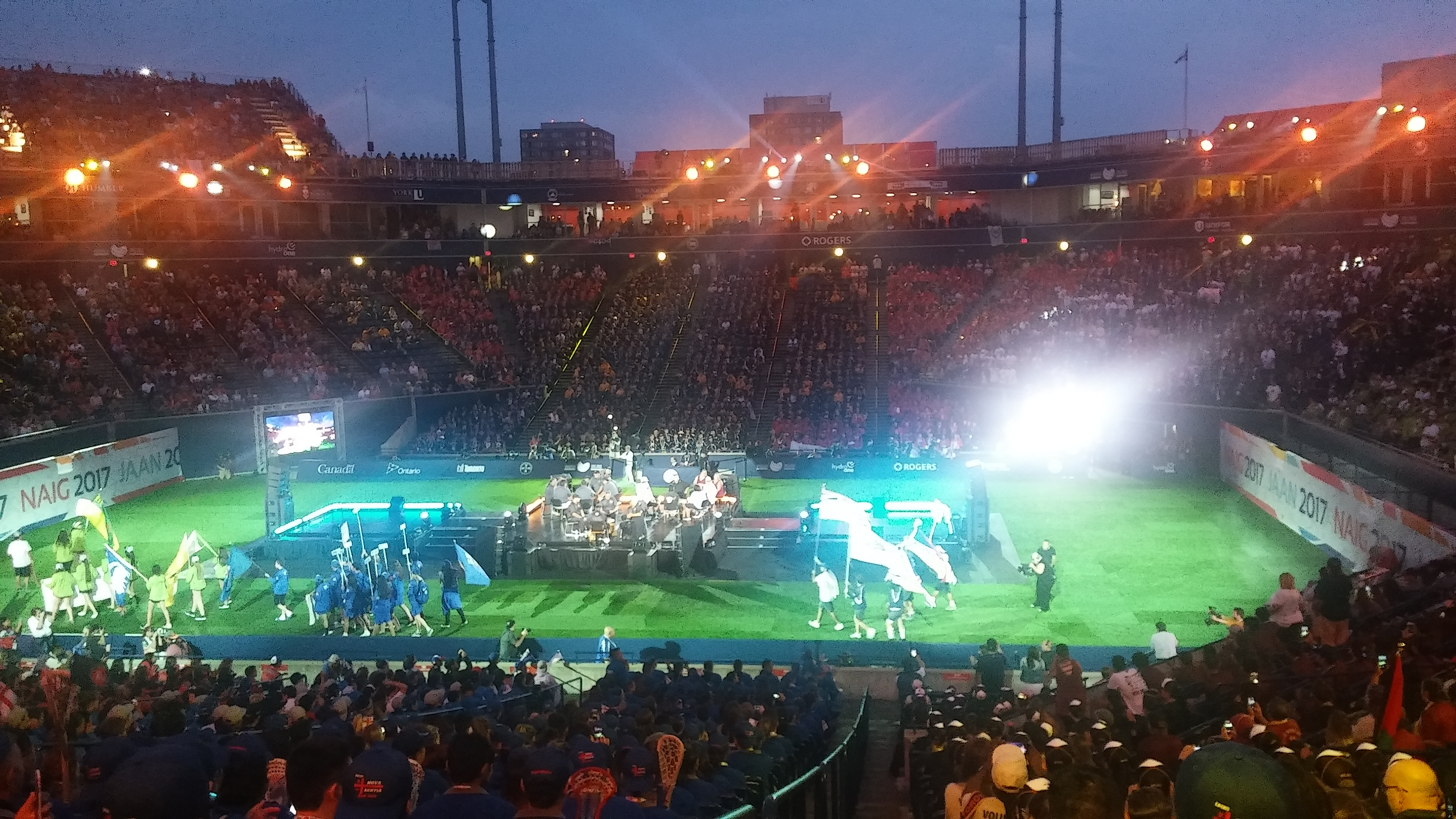
2017 North American Indigenous Games opening ceremony at Aviva Centre in Toronto

OC	Opening ceremony	●	Event competitions	1	Event finals	CC	Closing ceremony

July	16th Sun	17th Mon	18th Tues	19th Wed	20th Thurs	21st Fri	22nd Sat	Total
Ceremonies	OC						CC	
Archery			●	●	8			8
Athletics		6		30	26	22		84
Badminton		●	●	●	●	10		10
Baseball		●	●	●	1			1
Basketball		●	●	●	3	3		6
Lacrosse		●	●	●	1	2		3
Canoe/Kayak			21	12	22			55
Golf			●	1	3			4
Rifle shooting		●	4	8				12
Soccer		●	●	●	●	2	2	4
Softball		●	●	●	●	4		4
Swimming				2	50	56		108
Volleyball				●	●	●	4	4
Wrestling					23			23
Total gold medals		6	25	53	137	99	6	322
July	16th Sun	17th Mon	18th Tues	19th Wed	20th Thurs	21st Fri	22nd Sat	Total

== Participating regions ==
- Alberta (319)
- British Columbia (447)
- California (29)
- Colorado (100)
- Connecticut (9)
- Eastern Door and the North (313)
- Florida (83) (Note: Some athletes from The Bahamas competed for Florida.)
- Manitoba (445)
- Maine (43)
- Minnesota (72)
- New Brunswick (96)
- Newfoundland and Labrador (93)
- New York (187)
- Northwest Territories (242)
- Nova Scotia (192)
- Nunavut (77)
- Ontario (441)
- Prince Edward Island (27)
- Saskatchewan (432)
- Washington (131)
- Wisconsin (288)
- Yukon (195)

== Medal table ==
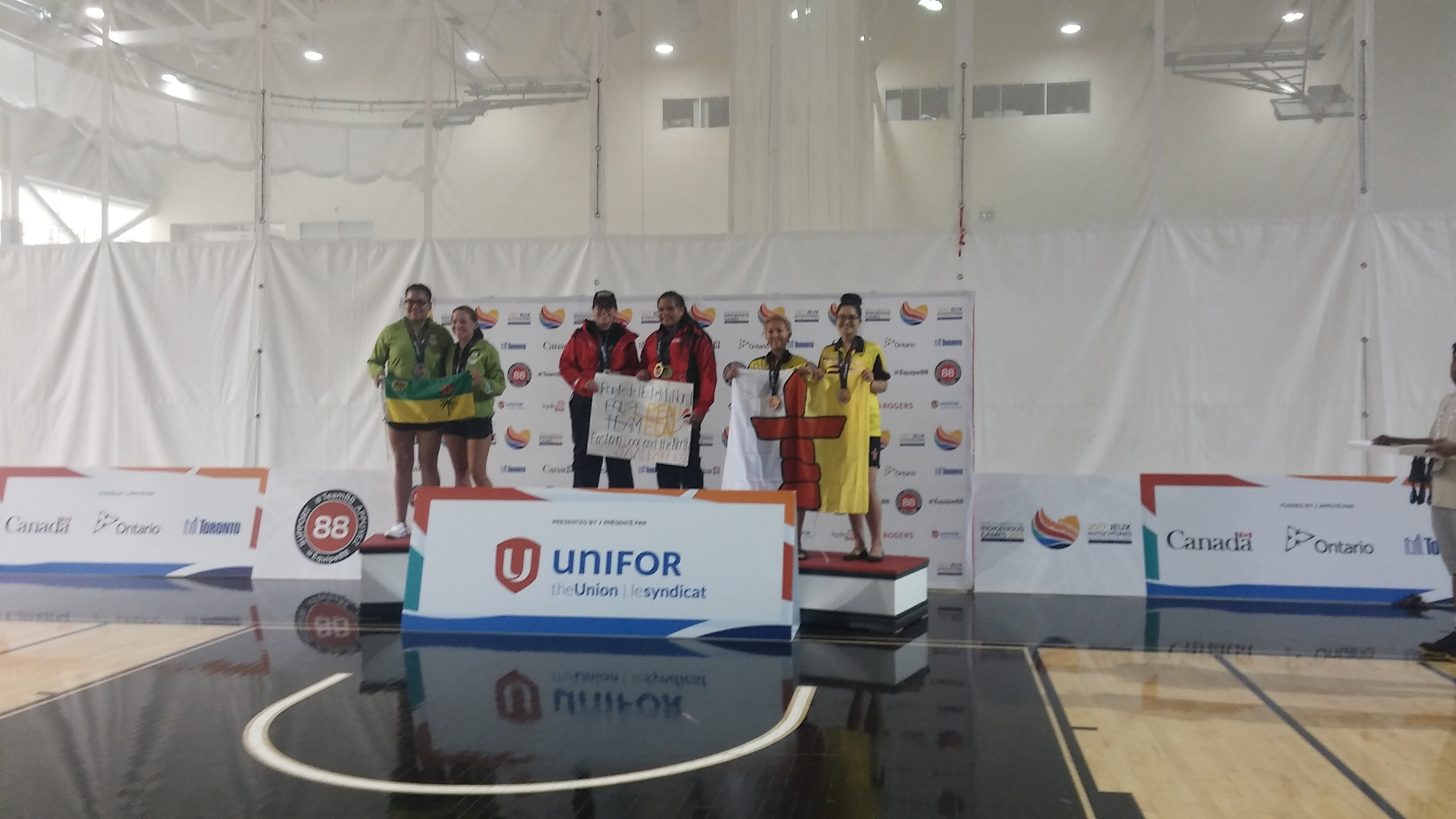
Medal ceremony for under-19 female doubles badminton medal ceremony

* Host nation (Host region)

Rank	Delegation	Gold	Silver	Bronze	Total
1	British Columbia	67	58	54	179
2	Saskatchewan	65	54	47	166
3	Ontario*	51	42	44	137
4	Alberta	34	26	16	76
5	Eastern Door & the North	22	36	19	77
6	Manitoba	17	21	16	54
7	Wisconsin	16	18	23	57
8	Washington	10	6	9	25
9	Northwest Territories	5	13	10	28
10	Yukon	5	8	10	23
11	Nova Scotia	5	7	4	16
12	Florida	4	0	1	5
13	New Brunswick	3	8	5	16
14	Newfoundland and Labrador	3	6	25	34
15	New York	3	3	7	13
16	Minnesota	1	1	2	4
17	California	1	1	0	2
18	Maine	0	3	6	9
19	Colorado	0	1	3	4
19	Nunavut	0	1	3	4
21	Prince Edward Island	0	0	3	3
Totals (21 entries)		312	313	307	932

== Medal summary ==
Event	Gold	Silver	Bronze
3D Archery - 16U Female Compound	Wisconsin; Olivia Prescott	New York; Cecelie Young	Florida; Aubee Billie
3D Archery - 16U Female Instinctive	Saskatchewan; Sky McIvor	Yukon; Jesse Kates	Northwest Territories; Bayleigh Chaplin
3D Archery - 16U Male Compound	Florida; Conner Thomas	Alberta; Warren Collins	Saskatchewan; Randall Dre Friday
3D Archery - 16U Male Instinctive	Saskatchewan; Gilly Disain	Alberta; Drayton Danais	Nova Scotia; Kent Denny
3D Archery - 19U Female	Saskatchewan; Tawnie Kotyk	New Brunswick; Monique Francis-Savoie	Nova Scotia; Zoe Jeddore
3D Archery - 19U Female Instinctive	Ontario; Kiauna Hendrick-Nicholas	Wisconsin; Kemewan Waupekenay	Saskatchewan; Charlie Bignife
3D Archery - 19U Male Compound	Nova Scotia; Ryan Francis	Saskatchewan; Sky Starr-Gorforth	Wisconsin; Daniel Herrera
3D Archery - 19U Male Instinctive	Saskatchewan; Ernest George	Nova Scotia; Stephen (Jaxson) Maloney	Prince Edward Island; Logen Lewis
Athletics - 14U Female 1200m	Ontario; Emily Dodge	Ontario; Francesca Pheasant	Saskatchewan; Sistene Yuzicappi
Athletics - 14U Female 150m	Wisconsin; Kailey Neosh	British Columbia; Taylor Daniels	Ontario; Shoniqua Bunce
Athletics - 14U Female 4 × 100 m Relay	Ontario	Saskatchewan	British Columbia
Athletics - 14U Female 4 × 400 m Relay	Ontario	Saskatchewan	(none - all other teams withdrew or were disqualified)
Athletics - 14U Female 800m	Saskatchewan; Sistene Yuzicappi	Ontario; Emily Dodge	British Columbia; Taylor Daniels
Athletics - 14U Female 80m	Wisconsin; Kailey Neosh	New Brunswick; Madison Wilson	Ontario; Shoniqua Bruce
Athletics - 14U Female Discus	Saskatchewan; Ronnie Thomas	Saskatchewan; Nydea Bird	Newfoundland and Labrador; Samantha Trask
Athletics - 14U Female High Jump	Manitoba; Breeann Pagee	Ontario; MacKenzie Innes	Alberta; Paige Richards
Athletics - 14U Female Javelin	Saskatchewan; Ronnie Thomas	Newfoundland and Labrador; Shilo Chislette	Newfoundland and Labrador; Samantha Trask
Athletics - 14U Female Long Jump	New Brunswick; Madison Wilson	Alberta; Paige Richards	British Columbia; Taylor Daniels
Athletics - 14U Female Shot Put	Saskatchewan; Ronnie Thomas	Saskatchewan; Madison Bird	Saskatchewan; Kansas McKay
Athletics - 14U Male 1200m	Saskatchewan; Kayden Clarke	Eastern Door & the North; Jessy James Paul-Cleary	Ontario; Julian Wemigwans
Athletics - 14U Male 150m	Saskatchewan; Cody Ludwig	Ontario; Dylan Yzenbrandt	Manitoba; Aidan Avanthay
Athletics - 14U Male 4 × 100 m Relay	Saskatchewan	Newfoundland and Labrador	Ontario
Athletics - 14U Male 4 × 400 m Relay	Saskatchewan	Ontario	Newfoundland and Labrador
Athletics - 14U Male 800m	Ontario; Dylan Yzenbrandt	Eastern Door & the North; Jessy James Paul-Cleary	Saskatchewan; Kayden Clarke
Athletics - 14U Male 80m	Saskatchewan; Cody Ludwig	Ontario; Dylan Yzenbrandt	British Columbia; Jaidyn McDonald
Athletics - 14U Male Discus	British Columbia; Jaden Knight	Saskatchewan; Anthony Rock	Saskatchewan; Christian McNab
Athletics - 14U Male High Jump	Nova Scotia; Diego Marshall	Saskatchewan; Rashuan Roberts	New Brunswick; Jacob Labillois; Wisconsin; Makyah Funmaker
Athletics - 14U Male Javelin	British Columbia; Jaden Knight	Saskatchewan; Anthony Rock	New York; Anyas Goeman
Athletics - 14U Male Long Jump	Nova Scotia; Diego Marshall	Saskatchewan; Cody Ludwig	Saskatchewan; Anthony Rock
Athletics - 14U Male Shot Put	Ontario; Aiden Gorveatt	British Columbia; Jaden Knight	Saskatchewan; Anthony Rock
Athletics - 16U Female 100m	Ontario; Jadyn Zeppa	Saskatchewan; Juleah Duesing	British Columbia; Kristen Clair
Athletics - 16U Female 1200m	Saskatchewan; Jaira Cross Child	British Columbia; Marquesis Haintz	New York; Siomara Caballero
Athletics - 16U Female 2000m	Saskatchewan; Jaira Cross Child	British Columbia; Marquesis Haintz	New York; Siomara Caballero
Athletics - 16U Female 200m	Ontario; Jadyn Zeppa	Saskatchewan; Juleah Duesing	British Columbia; Kristen Clair
Athletics - 16U Female 300m	Ontario; Jadyn Zeppa	Saskatchewan; Juleah Duesing	Ontario; Zena Pregent
Athletics - 16U Female 4 × 100 m Relay	Saskatchewan	Ontario	British Columbia
Athletics - 16U Female 4 × 400 m Relay	Saskatchewan	British Columbia	Ontario
Athletics - 16U Female 800m	Saskatchewan; Jaira Cross Child	New York; Siomara Caballero	British Columbia; Marquesis Haintz
Athletics - 16U Female Discus	British Columbia; Mateya Haintz	Saskatchewan; Jessamy Sundby	Maine; Liliana Sapiel
Athletics - 16U Female High Jump	Saskatchewan; Chantel Hewitt	British Columbia; Kiara Mack	Saskatchewan; Seaquin Rabbitskin
Athletics - 16U Female Javelin	Newfoundland and Labrador; Dana Chubb	Alberta; Cara HP Thomas	Ontario; Hannah Morningstar
Athletics - 16U Female Long Jump	Saskatchewan; Juleah Duesing	Ontario; Jadyn Zeppa	Saskatchewan; Chantel Hewitt
Athletics - 16U Female Shot Put	British Columbia; Mateya Haintz	Northwest Territories; Kayleigh McKay	Saskatchewan; Jessamy Sundby
Athletics - 16U Female Triple Jump	Saskatchewan; Chantel Hewitt	Northwest Territories; Hannah Courtorielle	Wisconsin; Kaitlyn McGeshick
Athletics - 16U Male 100m	Manitoba; Hunter Allen Rambow	Alberta; Stran Buffalo	Nova Scotia; Dante Isadore
Athletics - 16U Male 1200m	Saskatchewan; Dylan Bauman	New Brunswick; Jacob Tenass	Newfoundland and Labrador; Jeremy Holwell
Athletics - 16U Male 2000m	Saskatchewan; Dylan Bauman	Northwest Territories; Braeden Picek	Colorado; John Whyte
Athletics - 16U Male 200m	Manitoba; Hunter Allen Rambow	Nova Scotia; Dante Isadore	Alberta; Stan Buffalo
Athletics - 16U Male 300m	Manitoba; Hunter Allen Rambow	Ontario; Nicholas Burke	Colorado; Jonas Nanaeto
Athletics - 16U Male 4 × 100 m Relay	Saskatchewan	Nova Scotia	Ontario
Athletics - 16U Male 4 × 400 m Relay	Saskatchewan	Nova Scotia	Ontario
Athletics - 16U Male 800m	Saskatchewan; Dylan Bauman	Ontario; Nicholas Burke	New Brunswick; Jacob Tenass
Athletics - 16U Male Discus	British Columbia; Jacob Taylor	New Brunswick; Keith Dennis	Saskatchewan; Drayden Lapratt
Athletics - 16U Male High Jump	Ontario; Nicholas Burke	Alberta; Stran Buffalo	Saskatchewan; Shandel Rope
Athletics - 16U Male Javelin	British Columbia; Jacob Taylor	Nova Scotia; Dylon Francis	New York; Keegan Hemlock
Athletics - 16U Male Long Jump	Nova Scotia; Dante Isadore	Saskatchewan; Jordan Petit	Alberta; Stran Buffalo
Athletics - 16U Male Shot Put	Northwest Territories; Brayden Sinclair	Saskatchewan; Tony Randhile	New Brunswick; Keith Dennis; Ontario; Theron Fox
Athletics - 16U Male Triple Jump	Nova Scotia; Dante Isadore	Ontario; Lex Hergott	Alberta; Marcus Soto
Athletics - 19U Female 100m	Saskatchewan; Amanda Lepage	Ontario; Aliya Howard	Alberta; Rae-Lynn Billingsley
Athletics - 19U Female 1500m	Eastern Door & the North; Kendall Horn	Saskatchewan; Dezaray Wapass	Saskatchewan; Jordanna Goodpipe
Athletics - 19U Female 200m	Saskatchewan; Amanda Lepage	Eastern Door & the North; Kendall Horn	Saskatchewan; Taryn McKenzie
Athletics - 19U Female 3000m	Saskatchewan; Dezaray Wapass	Saskatchewan; Jordanna Goodpipe	British Columbia; Hannah McGuckin
Athletics - 19U Female 400m	Saskatchewan; Amanda Lepage	Saskatchewan; Taryn McKenzie	Eastern Door & the North; Kendall Horn
Athletics - 19U Female 4 × 100 m Relay	Saskatchewan	Alberta	Wisconsin
Athletics - 19U Female 4 × 400 m Relay	Saskatchewan	Eastern Door & the North	New Brunswick
Athletics - 19U Female 800m	Saskatchewan; Taryn McKenzie	Saskatchewan; Dezaray Wapass	Eastern Door & the North; Jennifer Tenasco
Athletics - 19U Female Discus	Wisconsin; TreVonna Rave	Saskatchewan; Dawnis McIvor	Wisconsin; Beshbeneshikwe Daniels
Athletics - 19U Female High Jump	Newfoundland and Labrador; Holly Brochu	Saskatchewan; Courtney Thrun	Saskatchewan; Sarah Watson
Athletics - 19U Female Javelin	Saskatchewan; Dawnis McIvor	Saskatchewan; Courtney Thrun	Yukon; Jayden Demchuk
Athletics - 19U Female Long Jump	Saskatchewan; Courtney Thrun	Manitoba; Brooklyn Rae Knaggs	Alberta; Rae-Lynn Billingsley
Athletics - 19U Female Shot Put	Saskatchewan; Courtney Thrun	Wisconsin; TreVonna Rave	Manitoba; Brooklyn Rae Knaggs
Athletics - 19U Female Triple Jump	Saskatchewan; Sarah Watson	Wisconsin; Jashelle King-Skenadore	Eastern Door & the North; Kendall Horn; Ontario Beatrice Nicholas
Athletics - 19U Male 100m	Ontario; Evan John	British Columbia; Rylee Mitchell	Alberta; Ethan Richards
Athletics - 19U Male 1500m	Ontario; Kiniw Cleland	Manitoba; Durrell Rots	Ontario; Gavin Wesley
Athletics - 19U Male 200m	Wisconsin; Jose Guzman	Ontario; Evan John	British Columbia; Rylee Mitchell
Athletics - 19U Male 3000m	Saskatchewan; Justin Bill	Manitoba; Durrell Rots	Ontario; Gavin Wesley
Athletics - 19U Male 400m	Wisconsin; Jose Guzman	British Columbia; Rylee Mitchell	Newfoundland and Labrador; George William Young
Athletics - 19U Male 4 × 100 m	Saskatchewan	Manitoba	Wisconsin
Athletics - 19U Male 4 × 400 m	Saskatchewan	Ontario	Newfoundland and Labrador
Athletics - 19U Male 800m	Manitoba; Durrell Rots	Ontario; Kiniw Cleland	Saskatchewan; Austin Bill
Athletics - 19U Male Discus	Saskatchewan; Brett Lachance	Ontario; Nathan Gionette	Wisconsin; Mesheanehsaeh Waukau
Athletics - 19U Male High Jump	British Columbia; Jason Rioux	Saskatchewan; Calvin Napope	Manitoba; Caleb Richard Kade Rudkewich
Athletics - 19U Male Javelin	New Brunswick; Brandon Robichaud	Manitoba; Eugene Chubb	Northwest Territories; Cole Clark
Athletics - 19U Male Long Jump	Saskatchewan; Calvin Napope	Ontario; Evan John	Wisconsin; Jose Guzman
Athletics - 19U Male Shot Put	Saskatchewan; Brett Lachance	British Columbia; Robert Warren	Wisconsin; Ryon Alloway
Athletics - 19U Male Triple Jump	British Columbia; Jason Rioux	Northwest Territories; Daniel Melanson	Northwest Territories; Jackson Christie
Badminton - 16U Female Doubles	Eastern Door & the North; Andesha Michel-St-Onge; Sydra Pilot-Grégoire	New Brunswick; Amber Solomon; Lindsey-Anne Tenass	Prince Edward Island; Keely Dyment; Nikeda Sark
Badminton - 16U Female Singles	Eastern Door & the North; Sydra Pilot-Grégoire	Eastern Door & the North; Andesha Michel-St-Onge	Prince Edward Island; Nikeda Sark
Badminton - 16U Male Doubles	Eastern Door & the North; Yann Grégoire; Nathaniel Mckenzie	Nunavut; Mike Kavik; Davidee Kudluarok	Manitoba; Avery Dick; Garnet William Stanly Sinclair
Badminton - 16U Male Singles	Eastern Door & the North; Nathaniel Mckenzie	Eastern Door & the North; Yann Grégoire	Nunavut; Davidee Kudluarok
Badminton - 16U Mixed Doubles	Eastern Door & the North; Andesha Michel-St-Onge; Nathaniel Mckenzie	Eastern Door & the North; Yann Grégoire; Sydra Pilot-Grégoire	Nunavut; Mike Kavik; Carla Kaayak
Badminton - 19U Female Doubles	Eastern Door & the North; Sabrina Ambroise; Daphnée Vollant	Saskatchewan; Megan Farrell; Kelsey Gamble	Nunavut; Anna Lambe; Mina Mannuk
Badminton - 19U Female Singles	Eastern Door & the North; Sabrina Ambroise	Eastern Door & the North; Daphnée Vollant	Saskatchewan; Megan Farrell
Badminton - 19U Male Doubles	British Columbia; Jarin Davison; Kyler Wilson	Saskatchewan; Darian Sunshine; Taylor Whitehead	Manitoba; Brenden Bighetty; Draven Alexander Hayashi
Badminton - 19U Male Singles	Saskatchewan; Taylor Whitehead	New Brunswick; Mathew Dedam	Eastern Door & the North; Rorakhwaie:shon Myiow
Badminton - 19U Mixed Doubles	British Columbia; Courtney Anderson; Jarin Davison	Saskatchewan; Darian Sunshine; Kelsey Gamble	Saskatchewan; Taylor Whitehead; Megan Farrell
Baseball - 17U Male	Wisconsin	Ontario	Saskatchewan
Basketball - 14U Female	Wisconsin	British Columbia	Minnesota
Basketball - 14U Male	Minnesota	British Columbia	Wisconsin
Basketball - 16U Female	New York	British Columbia	Wisconsin
Basketball - 16U Male	British Columbia	Wisconsin	Minnesota
Basketball - 19U Female	Ontario	Alberta	Wisconsin
Basketball - 19U Male	Washington	Minnesota	New York
Canoe / Kayak - 14U Female K1 1000m	Eastern Door & the North; Gracie Diabo	Eastern Door & the North; Sylvia White	Ontario; Sierra Mattson
Canoe / Kayak - 14U Female K1 200m	Eastern Door & the North; Gracie Diabo	Eastern Door & the North; Sylvia White	Ontario; Sierra Mattson
Canoe / Kayak - 14U Female K1 3000m	Eastern Door & the North; Sylvia White	Eastern Door & the North; Gracie Diabo	British Columbia; Monique Seanez
Canoe / Kayak - 14U Female MC1 1000m	British Columbia; Monique Seanez	Northwest Territories; Kyra McDonald	British Columbia; Julienne Wyse-Seward
Canoe / Kayak - 14U Female MC1 3000m	British Columbia; Monique Seanez	Northwest Territories; Kyra McDonald	British Columbia; Madelyn Morris
Canoe / Kayak - 14U Female MC2 1000m (Doubles)	British Columbia; Monique Seanez; Jennea Seward	Eastern Door & the North; Gracie Diabo; Sylvia White	British Columbia; Julienne Wyse-Seward; Madelyn Morris
Canoe / Kayak - 14U Female MC2 3000m (Doubles)			
Canoe / Kayak - 14U Male K1 1000m	Eastern Door & the North; Thahawitha Curotte	Maine; Javier Alicea-Santiago	British Columbia; Noah Gray
Canoe / Kayak - 14U Male K1 200m	Eastern Door & the North; Thahawitha Curotte	Maine; Javier Alicea-Santiago	British Columbia; Silas Wilson
Canoe / Kayak - 14U Male K1 3000m	British Columbia; Memphis Wyse	Eastern Door & the North; Thahawitha Curotte	Saskatchewan; Xavier Paul
Canoe / Kayak - 14U Male MC1 1000m	Saskatchewan; Gaberik Dorion	Maine; Javier Alicea-Santiago	Washington; Ryan James
Canoe / Kayak - 14U Male MC1 3000m	British Columbia; William Wyse	Washington; Jaymz Roberts-Christjohn	British Columbia; Silas Wilson
Canoe / Kayak - 14U Male MC2 1000m	British Columbia; Memphis Wyse; Silas Wilson	Saskatchewan; Gaberik Dorion; Percy McKenzie	Washington; Jaymz Roberts-Christjohn; Moses Seymour
Canoe / Kayak - 14U Male MC2 3000m	British Columbia; Memphis Wyse; Noah Gray	Saskatchewan; Gaberik Dorion; Percy McKenzie	Washington; Andrew Williams; Louis Williams
Canoe / Kayak - 14U Mixed MC2 1000m (Doubles)	British Columbia; Julienne Wyse-Seward; William Wyse	Saskatchewan; Gaberik Dorion; Codie Charles	Eastern Door & the North; Thahawitha Curotte; Gracie Diabo
Canoe / Kayak - 14U Mixed MC2 3000m (Doubles)	British Columbia; Madelyn Morris; Memphis Wyse	British Columbia; Monique Seanez; Silas Wilson	Maine; Javier Alicea-Santiago; Sheylee Sapiel
Canoe / Kayak - 16U Female K1 1000m	Eastern Door & the North; Konwanakeren Diabo	Eastern Door & the North; Kakwitene Jacobs	British Columbia; Valerie Paul
Canoe / Kayak - 16U Female K1 200m	Eastern Door & the North; Konwanakeren Diabo	Ontario; Gabriella Corbiere	Eastern Door & the North; Nikki Kirby
Canoe / Kayak - 16U Female K1 3000m	Eastern Door & the North; Konwanakeren Diabo	Eastern Door & the North; Kakwitene Jacobs	British Columbia; Kristine Edgar
Canoe / Kayak - 16U Female MC1 1000m	Washington; Cei'j Gagnon	Northwest Territories; Mackenzie Granger	British Columbia; Chelsei Gray
Canoe / Kayak - 16U Female MC1 3000m	Washington; Cei'j Gagnon	British Columbia; Emerald Julia John	British Columbia; Breanna Seymour
Canoe / Kayak - 16U Female MC2 1000m (Doubles)	British Columbia; Chelsei Gray; Breanna Seymour	Eastern Door & the North; Kakwitene Jacobs; Nikki Kirby	Washington; Ah-nika-leesh Chiquiti; Jenavieve Old Coyote Bagley
Canoe / Kayak - 16U Female MC2 3000m (Doubles)	British Columbia; Emerald John; Breanna Seymour	Washington; Aaliyah George; Jessica Roberts	Saskatchewan; Presley McCallum; Caley Morin
Canoe / Kayak - 16U Male K1 1000m	Ontario; Shkaabewis Tabobondung	Eastern Door & the North; Karontatsi Rice	Maine; Damon Galipeau
Canoe / Kayak - 16U Male K1 200m	Ontario; Shkaabewis Tabobondung	Eastern Door & the North; Karontatsi Rice	Maine; Shea Hines
Canoe / Kayak - 16U Male K1 3000m	Ontario; Shkaabewis Tabobondung	Eastern Door & the North; Karontatsi Rice	British Columbia; Tyson Seward
Canoe / Kayak - 16U Male MC1 1000m	Washington; Zachary Williams	Manitoba; Alfred (Rain) Miswaggon	Maine; Apemesim Galipeau
Canoe / Kayak - 16U Male MC1 3000m	Washington; Zachary Williams	British Columbia; Tyson Seward	Maine; Apemesim Galipeau
Canoe / Kayak - 16U Male MC2 1000m (Doubles)	Washington; Chance Olson; Jaymz Roberts-Christjohn	Eastern Door & the North; Thahawitha Curotte; Karontatsi Rice	Manitoba; Clayton Muskwa; Alfred (Rain) Miswaggon
Canoe / Kayak - 16U Male MC2 3000m (Doubles)	Manitoba; Clayton Muskwa; Alfred (Rain) Miswaggon	Eastern Door & the North; Thahawitha Curotte; Karontatsi Rice	Saskatchewan; Colson T. Sewap; Donovan Custer
Canoe / Kayak - 16U Mixed MC2 1000m (Doubles)	Manitoba; Alfred (Rain) Miswaggon; Kennesha Creelyn Miswaggon	Washington; Aaliyah George; Zachary Williams	British Columbia; Valerie Paul; William Wyse
Canoe / Kayak - 16U Mixed MC2 3000m (Doubles)	British Columbia; Breanna Seymour; Tyson Seward	Eastern Door & the North; Karontatsi Rice; Konwanakeren Diabo	Washington; Aaliyah George; Zachary Williams
Canoe / Kayak - 19U Female K1 1000m	Ontario; Zeyana Laplante	Eastern Door & the North; Belle Phillips	Ontario; Audrey-Anna Colson
Canoe / Kayak - 19U Female K1 200m	Ontario; Zeyana Laplante	Eastern Door & the North; Belle Phillips	Ontario; Audrey-Anna Colson
Canoe / Kayak - 19U Female K1 3000m	Ontario; Zeyana Laplante	Eastern Door & the North; Belle Phillips	Ontario; Audrey-Anna Colson
Canoe / Kayak - 19U Female K1 6000m	Ontario; Audrey-Anna Colson	Eastern Door & the North; Taiosheratie Diabo	Eastern Door & the North; Danika Zachary
Canoe / Kayak - 19U Female MC1 1000m	Northwest Territories; Davina McLeod	Washington; Gina McCaulley	Eastern Door & the North; Taiosheratie Diabo
Canoe / Kayak - 19U Female MC1 3000m	Washington; Kayleasha Davis	British Columbia; Josephine Seward	Eastern Door & the North; Taiosheratie Diabo
Canoe / Kayak - 19U Female MC1 6000m	British Columbia; Jordana Seymour	Washington; Gina McCaulley	British Columbia; Kasey Wyse
Canoe / Kayak - 19U Female MC2 1000m (Doubles)	Washington; Gina McCaulley; Kayleasha Davis	Northwest Territories; Taylor McLeod; Davina McLeod	British Columbia; Janessa Horne; Brittney Sam
Canoe / Kayak - 19U Female MC2 3000m (Doubles)	Washington; Gina McCaulley; Cie'j Gagnon	Northwest Territories; Mackenzie Granger; Davina McLeod	Eastern Door & the North; Taiosheratie Diabo; Danika Zachary
Canoe / Kayak - 19U Female MC2 6000m (Doubles)	Washington; Gina McCaulley; Kayleasha Davis	Eastern Door & the North; Konwanakeren Diabo; Danika Zachary	British Columbia; Brittney Sam; Jordana Seymour
Canoe / Kayak - 19U Male K1 1000m	Ontario; Eric Weston	Ontario; Dawson Nootchtai	British Columbia; Trey Gray-Thorne
Canoe / Kayak - 19U Male K1 200m	Ontario; Eric Weston	Ontario; Dawson Nootchtai	British Columbia; Ivan Morris
Canoe / Kayak - 19U Male K1 3000m	Ontario; Eric Weston	Ontario; Dawson Nootchtai	British Columbia; Ivan Morris
Canoe / Kayak - 19U Male K1 6000m	Ontario; Eric Weston	Ontario; Dawson Nootchtai	British Columbia; Ivan Morris
Canoe / Kayak - 19U Male MC1 1000m	British Columbia; Michael Wyse	British Columbia; Gordon George	Saskatchewan; Mateo Custer
Canoe / Kayak - 19U Male MC1 3000m	British Columbia; Michael Wyse	British Columbia; Trey Gray-Thorne	Washington; Hamilton Seymour
Canoe / Kayak - 19U Male MC1 6000m	British Columbia; Brandyn Chappell	Washington; Dionisio Ritualo-Romero	British Columbia; Gordon George
Canoe / Kayak - 19U Male MC2 1000m (Doubles)	British Columbia; Brandyn Chappell; Michael Wyse	Saskatchewan; Mateo Custer; Andrew Dorion	Northwest Territories; Darius Andre; Ethan Catholique-Rombough
Canoe / Kayak - 19U Male MC2 3000m (Doubles)	British Columbia; Trey Gray-Thorne; Gordon George	British Columbia; Ivan Morris; Michael Wyse	Washington; Hamilton Seymour; Dionisio Ritualo-Romero
Canoe / Kayak - 19U Male MC2 6000m (Doubles)	British Columbia; Brandyn Chappell; Michael Wyse	Saskatchewan; Mateo Custer; Andrew Dorion	Washington; Hamilton Seymour; Dionisio Ritualo-Romero
Canoe / Kayak - 19U Mixed MC2 1000m (Doubles)	British Columbia; Josephine Seward; Brandyn Chappell	British Columbia; Trey Gray-Thorne; Jordana Seymour	Washington; Catherine Stensgar; Dionisio Ritualo-Romero
Canoe / Kayak - 19U Mixed MC2 3000m (Doubles)			
Canoe / Kayak - 19U Mixed MC2 6000m (Doubles)	Ontario; Adrianne Kakekagumic; Delaney Webkamigad	British Columbia; Michael Wyse; Jordana Seymour	Yukon; Jedrek Dendys; Alice Frost-Hanberg
Cross Country - 14U Male 2K	Eastern Door & the North; Jessy James Paul-Cleary	Yukon; Naoise Dempsey	Saskatchewan; Kayden Clarke
Cross Country - 14U Female 2K	Ontario; Emily Dodge	Ontario; Francesca Pheasant	Saskatchewan; Sistene Yuzicappi
Cross Country - 16U Male 3K	Saskatchewan; Dylan Bauman	Colorado; John Whyte	Newfoundland and Labrador; Jeremy Holwell
Cross Country - 16U Female 3K	Saskatchewan; Jaira Cross Child	British Columbia; Marquesis Haintz	New York; Siomara Caballero
Cross Country - 19U Male 6K	Manitoba; Durrell Rots	Ontario; Gavin Wesley	Saskatchewan; Justin Bill
Cross Country - 19U Female 6K	Saskatchewan; Dezaray Wapass	Saskatchewan; Jordanna Goodpipe	British Columbia; Hannah McGuckin
Golf - 17U Female	Northwest Territories; Deanne Whenham	Saskatchewan; Maycie Gardypie	Alberta; Mikayla Nepoose-Wood
Golf - 17U Male	Manitoba; Ryan Blair	Wisconsin; Jamozzy Skenandore	Wisconsin; Trent Thomas
Golf - 19U Female	Alberta; Jillane Bearhead	Wisconsin; Tianna Decora	Wisconsin; Presley Cornelius
Golf - 19U Male	British Columbia; Alexander Webber	Eastern Door & the North; Brett Dearhouse	Manitoba; Cameron Riel
Lacrosse - 16U Male	Ontario	Saskatchewan	New York
Lacrosse - 19U Female	Eastern Door & the North	Ontario	British Columbia
Lacrosse - 19U Male	Ontario	New York	British Columbia
Rifle Shooting - 16U Female 3P	Saskatchewan; Arianna Piche	Northwest Territories; Danika Burke	Saskatchewan; Inez Blind
Rifle Shooting - 16U Female Overall	Saskatchewan; Arianna Piche	Northwest Territories; Danika Burke	Saskatchewan; Inez Blind
Rifle Shooting - 16U Female Prone	Northwest Territories; Danika Burke	Saskatchewan; Inez Blind	Saskatchewan; Arianna Piche
Rifle Shooting - 16U Male 3P	Florida; Santiago Billie	British Columbia; Jared Erickson	British Columbia; Anthony Joe
Rifle Shooting - 16U Male Overall	Florida; Santiago Billie	British Columbia; Jared Erickson	British Columbia; Anthony Joe
Rifle Shooting - 16U Male Prone	Northwest Territories; Gaius Crook	British Columbia; Anthony Joe; Saskatchewan; Montrell Blind	
Rifle Shooting - 19U Female 3P	Saskatchewan; Haley McCallum-Naytowhow	British Columbia; Sunshine O'Donovan	Saskatchewan; Nidahnia Blind
Rifle Shooting - 19U Female Overall	Saskatchewan; Haley McCallum-Naytowhow	British Columbia; Sunshine O'Donovan	Saskatchewan; Nidahnia Blind
Rifle Shooting - 19U Female Prone	Saskatchewan; Nidahnia Blind	British Columbia; Sunshine O'Donovan	Northwest Territories; Tamara Lafferty
Rifle Shooting - 19U Male 3P	British Columbia; Mark Anthony Roberts	British Columbia; Matthew Britton	Saskatchewan; Brayden Janvier
Rifle Shooting - 19U Male Overall	British Columbia; Mark Anthony Roberts	British Columbia; Matthew Britton	Saskatchewan; Brayden Janvier
Rifle Shooting - 19U Male Prone	Yukon; Corey Roberts	Saskatchewan; Brayden Janvier	British Columbia; Matthew Britton
Soccer - 16U Female	British Columbia	Saskatchewan	Ontario
Soccer - 16U Male	British Columbia	Saskatchewan	Alberta
Soccer - 19U Female	British Columbia	Eastern Door & the North	Saskatchewan
Soccer - 19U Male	British Columbia	Saskatchewan	Manitoba
Softball - 16U Female	California	Ontario	British Columbia
Softball - 16U Male	Saskatchewan	Ontario	Manitoba
Softball - 19U Female	Saskatchewan	Alberta	Wisconsin
Softball - 19U Male	Ontario	California	Saskatchewan
Swimming - 14U Female 100m Backstroke	British Columbia; Claire Brown	Alberta; Salima Thibault	Alberta; Kathryn Fedderson
Swimming - 14U Female 100m Breaststroke	British Columbia; Hunter Stewardson	Alberta; Dawn-Marie L'Heureux	Yukon; Kassua Dreyer
Swimming - 14U Female 100m Butterfly	British Columbia; Claire Brown	Alberta; Salima Thibault	Ontario; Martha Scott
Swimming - 14U Female 100m Freestyle	Alberta; Kathryn Fedderson	British Columbia; Hunter Stewardson	Alberta; Emma Leishman
Swimming - 14U Female 200m Backstroke	British Columbia; Claire Brown	Manitoba; Emily Jayne Dumont Robertson	Saskatchewan; Elena Park
Swimming - 14U Female 200m Breaststroke	British Columbia; Hunter Stewardson	Yukon; Kassua Dreyer	Alberta; Dawn-Marie L'Heureux
Swimming - 14U Female 200m Butterfly	Alberta; Salima Thibault	British Columbia; Claire Brown	Ontario; Martha Scott
Swimming - 14U Female 200m Freestyle	Ontario; Martha Scott	Alberta; Dawn-Marie L'Heureux	Ontario; Ayden Michaud
Swimming - 14U Female 200m Individual Medley	Alberta; Dawn-Marie L'Heureux	British Columbia; Hunter Stewardson	Ontario; Ayden Michaud
Swimming - 14U Female 400m Freestyle	Ontario; Ayden Michaud	Yukon; Kassua Dreyer	Alberta; Alexandria Karamujic
Swimming - 14U Female 4 × 100 m Freestyle Relay	British Columbia	Alberta	Ontario
Swimming - 14U Female 4x50m Freestyle Relay	British Columbia	Alberta	Ontario
Swimming - 14U Female 4x50m Medley Relay	British Columbia	Alberta	Ontario
Swimming - 14U Female 50m Backstroke	Manitoba; Maxine Sophie Leavitt	British Columbia; Emma Jolliffe	Eastern Door & the North; Cadence Lerennothe Patton
Swimming - 14U Female 50m Breaststroke	British Columbia; Hunter Stewardson	Alberta; Kathryn Fedderson	Yukon; Kassua Dreyer
Swimming - 14U Female 50m Butterfly	British Columbia; Claire Brown	Alberta; Salima Thibault	Ontario; Martha Scott
Swimming - 14U Female 50m Freestyle	Alberta; Salima Thibault	Alberta; Kathryn Fedderson	British Columbia; Hunter Stewardson
Swimming - 14U Female 800m Freestyle	Yukon; Kassua Dreyer	Ontario; Ayden Michaud	Manitoba; Emily Jayne Dumont Robertson
Swimming - 14U Male 100m Backstroke	British Columbia; Kade Schwarz	Saskatchewan; Slade Pruden	Eastern Door & the North; Peter Thais
Swimming - 14U Male 100m Breaststroke	British Columbia; William Swyers	British Columbia; Kade Schwarz	Newfoundland and Labrador; Jacob Sheppard
Swimming - 14U Male 100m Butterfly	Ontario; Kevin Ireland	British Columbia; Jadyn Johnston	Northwest Territories; Marshall Brown
Swimming - 14U Male 100m Freestyle	Ontario; Kevin Ireland	British Columbia; William Swyers	Saskatchewan; Slade Pruden
Swimming - 14U Male 1500m Freestyle	Ontario; Kevin Ireland	British Columbia; Jadyn Johnston	(None - the only other competitor withdrew)
Swimming - 14U Male 200m Backstroke	British Columbia; Kade Schwarz	Saskatchewan; Liam Murphy	Northwest Territories; Jacob Mitchener
Swimming - 14U Male 200m Breaststroke	British Columbia; Kade Schwarz	Newfoundland and Labrador; Jacob Sheppard	Newfoundland and Labrador; Aaron Porter
Swimming - 14U Male 200m Butterfly	British Columbia; Jadyn Johnston	Northwest Territories; Marshall Brown	Newfoundland and Labrador; Aaron Porter
Swimming - 14U Male 200m Freestyle	Ontario; Kevin Ireland	British Columbia; Jadyn Johnston	Northwest Territories; Jacob Mitchener
Swimming - 14U Male 200m Individual Medley	British Columbia; William Swyers	Eastern Door & the North; Peter Thais	Saskatchewan Slade Pruden
Swimming - 14U Male 400m Freestyle	Ontario; Kevin Ireland	British Columbia; Jadyn Johnston	Northwest Territories; Marshall Brown
Swimming - 14U Male 50m Backstroke	British Columbia; William Swyers	British Columbia; Kade Schwarz	Eastern Door & the North; Peter Thais
Swimming - 14U Male 50m Breaststroke	British Columbia; William Swyers	British Columbia; Kade Schwarz	Saskatchewan; Slade Pruden
Swimming - 14U Male 50m Butterfly	British Columbia; Jadyn Johnston	Saskatchewan; Slade Pruden	Alberta; Colin J. Buffalo
Swimming - 14U Male 50m Freestyle	Ontario; Kevin Ireland	British Columbia; William Swyers	Saskatchewan; Slade Pruden
Swimming - 16U Female 100m Backstroke	Alberta; Alycia Weber	Saskatchewan; Madison Diaz	Ontario; Emma Begg
Swimming - 16U Female 100m Breaststroke	Alberta; Venna Anderson	Alberta; Mckenzi Huhn	Yukon; Rennes Lindsay
Swimming - 16U Female 100m Butterfly	Alberta; Alycia Weber	Yukon; Rennes Lyndsay	British Columbia; Amy Leighton
Swimming - 16U Female 100m Freestyle	Alberta; Venna Anderson	Alberta; Alycia Weber	British Columbia; Amy Leighton
Swimming - 16U Female 200m Backstroke	Alberta; Alycia Weber	Ontario; Emma Begg	Saskatchewan; Madison Diaz
Swimming - 16U Female 200m Breaststroke	Wisconsin; Gabriela Goodbear	British Columbia; Simsimtko Whitewing	Ontario; Sarah Rittau
Swimming - 16U Female 200m Butterfly	British Columbia; Amy Leighton	Manitoba; Lily Lynn Mabel Sanderson	Wisconsin; Makenna Winnicki
Swimming - 16U Female 200m Freestyle	Yukon; Rennes Lindsay	Alberta; Venna Anderson	Wisconsin; Gabriela Goodbear
Swimming - 16U Female 200m Individual Medley	British Columbia; Amy Leighton	Ontario; Emma Begg	Yukon; Brooklyn Massie
Swimming - 16U Female 400m Freestyle	Yukon; Rennes Lindsay	Wisconsin; Gabriela Goodbear	Ontario; Alicia Corbriere
Swimming - 16U Female 4 × 100 m Freestyle Relay	Alberta	Wisconsin	Ontario
Swimming - 16U Female 4x50m Freestyle Relay	Alberta	Ontario	Wisconsin
Swimming - 16U Female 4x50m Medley Relay	Alberta	Ontario	Wisconsin
Swimming - 16U Female 50m Backstroke	Alberta; Alycia Weber	Saskatchewan; Madison Diaz	Alberta; Venna Anderson
Swimming - 16U Female 50m Breaststroke	Alberta; Venna Anderson	Alberta; Mckenzi Huhn	Ontario; Jacy Gagne
Swimming - 16U Female 50m Butterfly	Alberta; Alycia Weber	British Columbia; Amy Leighton	Newfoundland and Labrador; Phoebe McNeil
Swimming - 16U Female 50 Freestyle	Alberta; Venna Anderson	British Columbia; Carter Basil-Pelly	Ontario; Alicia Corbiere
Swimming - 16U Female 800m Freestyle	British Columbia; Amy Leighton	Wisconsin; Makenna Winnicki	Wisconsin; Gabriela Goodbear
Swimming - 16U Male 100m Backstroke	Manitoba; Mason Steffens-Benoit	Eastern Door & the North; Cedric Awashish	British Columbia; Warren Barton
Swimming - 16U Male 100m Breaststroke	Alberta; Apollo Hess	Eastern Door & the North; Caleb Awashish	Saskatchewan; Rainer Olson
Swimming - 16U Male 100m Butterfly	Manitoba; Kienan William Scribe	Manitoba; Mason Steffens-Benoit	Alberta; Apollo Hess
Swimming - 16U Male 100m Freestyle	Alberta; Apollo Hess	Manitoba; Kienan William Scribe	British Columbia; Warren Barton
Swimming - 16U Male 1500m Freestyle	Eastern Door & the North; Caleb Awashish	Newfoundland and Labrador; Ryan Parsons	British Columbia; Ethan Amos
Swimming - 16U Male 200m Backstroke	Saskatchewan; Rainer Olson	Eastern Door & the North; Cedric Awashish	Manitoba; Mason Steffens-Benoit
Swimming - 16U Male 200m Breaststroke	Alberta; Apollo Hess	Saskatchewan; Rainer Olson	Eastern Door & the North; Caleb Awashish
Swimming - 16U Male 200m Butterfly			
Swimming - 16U Male 200m Freestyle	Eastern Door & the North; Cedric Awashish	Newfoundland and Labrador; Ryan Parsons	Newfoundland and Labrador; Noah Coombs
Swimming - 16U Male 200m Individual Medley	Alberta; Apollo Hess	Saskatchewan; Rainer Olson	Eastern Door & the North; Caleb Awashish
Swimming - 16U Male 400m Freestyle	Newfoundland and Labrador; Ryan Parsons	Eastern Door & the North; Caleb Awashish	Newfoundland and Labrador; Noah Coombs
Swimming - 16U Male 4 × 100 m Freestyle Relay	British Columbia	Newfoundland and Labrador	Ontario
Swimming - 16U Male 4x50m Freestyle Relay	Manitoba	British Columbia	Newfoundland and Labrador
Swimming - 16U Male 4x50m Medley Relay	British Columbia	Ontario	(None - the only other team was disqualified)
Swimming - 16U Male 50m Backstroke	Manitoba; Mason Steffens-Benoit	Manitoba; Kienan William Scribe	British Columbia; Warren Barton
Swimming - 16U Male 50m Breaststroke	Alberta; Apollo Hess	Alberta; Jameson Twigg	Newfoundland and Labrador; Ryan Parsons
Swimming - 16U Male 50m Butterfly	Manitoba; Kienan William Scribe	Manitoba; Mason Steffens-Benoit	Ontario; Jesse Hughes
Swimming - 16U Male 50m Freestyle	Manitoba; Kienan William Scribe	Eastern Door & the North; Cedric Awashish	Saskatchewan; Rainer Olson
Swimming - 19U Female 100m Backstroke	Yukon; Cassis Lindsay	British Columbia; Jamie Hutton	Manitoba; Jessika Sky Wilson
Swimming - 19U Female 100m Breaststroke	Ontario; Maddy Lavoie	Wisconsin; Briana Zablocki	Northwest Territories; Alexandra Buhler
Swimming - 19U Female 100m Butterfly	Ontario; Kristen Quigley	Wisconsin; Briana Zablocki	Yukon; Cassis Lindsay
Swimming - 19U Female 100m Freestyle	Ontario; Mayheve Rondeau	Ontario; Kristen Quigley	Yukon; Cassis Lindsay
Swimming - 19U Female 200m Backstroke	Ontario; Maddy Lavoie	Ontario; Kristen Quigley	British Columbia; Kleanza Cathers
Swimming - 19U Female 200m Breaststroke	Ontario; Maddy Lavoie	Northwest Territories; Alexandra Buhler	Newfoundland and Labrador; Brooke Batt
Swimming - 19U Female 200m Butterfly	Wisconsin; Briana Zablocki	Ontario; Kristen Quigley	Ontario; Renee Corbiere
Swimming - 19U Female 200m Freestyle	Ontario; Mayheve Rondeau	Ontario; Kristen Quigley	Wisconsin; Briana Zablocki
Swimming - 19U Female 200m Individual Medley	Wisconsin; Briana Zablocki	British Columbia; Jamie Hutton	Newfoundland and Labrador; Brooke Batt
Swimming - 19U Female 400m Freestyle	Ontario; Mayheve Rondeau	British Columbia; Kleanza Cathers	Newfoundland and Labrador; Jessica Dyson
Swimming - 19U Female 4 × 100 m Freestyle Relay	Ontario	Wisconsin	Manitoba
Swimming - 19U Female 4x50 Freestyle Relay	Ontario	Yukon	Wisconsin
Swimming - 19U Female 4x50m Medley Relay	Ontario	Wisconsin	British Columbia
Swimming - 19U Female 50m Backstroke	Ontario; Maddy Lavoie	Yukon; Cassis Lindsay	Ontario; Mayheve Rondeau
Swimming - 19U Female 50m Breaststroke	Ontario; Maddy Lavoie	Ontario; Mayheve Rondeau	Newfoundland and Labrador; Brooke Batt
Swimming - 19U Female 50m Butterfly	Ontario; Kristen Quigley	Yukon; Cassis Lindsay	Ontario; Renee Corbiere
Swimming - 19U Female 50m Freestyle	Ontario; Mayheve Rondeau	British Columbia; Kleanza Cathers	Yukon; Cassis Lindsay
Swimming - 19U Female 800m Freestyle	British Columbia; Kleanza Cathers	Manitoba; Jessika Sky Wilson	Newfoundland and Labrador; Aimee Gignac-Butt
Swimming - 19U Male 100m Backstroke	Alberta; Justin Lisoway	Saskatchewan; Tristan Anderson-Woodsworth	Ontario; Isaac Callaghan
Swimming - 19U Male 100m Breaststroke	Alberta; Justin Lisoway	Saskatchewan; Tristan Anderson-Woodsworth	Wisconsin; Jackie Zablocki
Swimming - 19U Male 100m Butterfly	Wisconsin; Jackie Zablocki	British Columbia; Garnet Currie	Nova Scotia; Noah Joudrie
Swimming - 19U Male 100m Freestyle	Alberta; Justin Lisoway	Wisconsin; Jackie Zablocki	Manitoba; Ryan Phillip Neilson
Swimming - 19U Male 200m Backstroke	British Columbia; Jesse Shade	(None - Remaining competitors either did not start or withdrew)	
Swimming - 19U Male 200m Breaststroke	Saskatchewan; Tristan Anderson-Woodsworth	Manitoba; Brendan Cruickshanks	British Columbia; Travis Pete
Swimming - 19U Male 200m Butterfly			
Swimming - 19U Male 200m Freestyle	Manitoba; Ryan Phillip Neilson	Nova Scotia; Noah Joudrie	British Columbia; Jesse Shade
Swimming - 19U Male 200m Individual Medley	Alberta; Justin Lisoway	Wisconsin; Jackie Zablocki	Saskatchewan; Tristan Anderson-Woodsworth
Swimming - 19U Male 400m Freestyle	Manitoba; Ryan Phillip Neilson	British Columbia; Garnet Currie	
Swimming - 19U Male 4 × 100 m Freestyle Relay	Alberta	Manitoba	British Columbia
Swimming - 19U Male 4x50m Freestyle Relay	Alberta	British Columbia	Eastern Door & the North
Swimming - 19U Male 4x50m Medley Relay	Alberta	Manitoba	British Columbia
Swimming - 19U Male 50m Backstroke	Alberta; Justin Lisoway	Manitoba; Ryan Phillip Neilson	Ontario; Isaac Callaghan
Swimming - 19U Male 50m Breaststroke	Alberta; Jack Omeasoo	Ontario; Isaac Callaghan	Manitoba; Brendan Cruickshanks
Swimming - 19U Male 50m Butterfly	Wisconsin; Jackie Zablocki	Ontario; Isaac Callaghan; British Columbia; Garnet Currie	
Swimming - 19U Male 50m Freestyle	Alberta; Justin Lisoway	Manitoba; Ryan Phillip Neilson	Ontario; Isaac Callaghan
Volleyball - 16U Female	Alberta	British Columbia	Manitoba
Volleyball - 16U Male	Saskatchewan	Alberta	Manitoba
Volleyball - 19U Female	Alberta	Saskatchewan	Ontario
Volleyball - 19U Male	Saskatchewan	Alberta	Newfoundland and Labrador
Wrestling - Female 38 kg			
Wrestling - Female 40 kg			
Wrestling - Female 43 kg			
Wrestling - Female 46 kg			
Wrestling - Female 49 kg	Saskatchewan; Danika LaLonde	Manitoba; Mikwan Dumas	(None - only two competitors entered)
Wrestling - Female 52 kg	Saskatchewan; Alicia Kent	Manitoba; Tashina Wood	Newfoundland and Labrador; Alaina Marie Wheeler
Wrestling - Female 60 kg	Saskatchewan; Skyla Russell	New Brunswick; Brooke Sacobie	Yukon; Judy Russell
Wrestling - Female 65 kg	New York; Kendra Cheers	Eastern Door & the North; Kennikahontesha Norton-Montour	British Columbia; Morgan Dagenais
Wrestling - Female 70 kg	New Brunswick; Jada Levi-Ward	Saskatchewan; Abby Wright	Eastern Door & the North; Stella Mccomber
Wrestling - Female 80 kg	British Columbia; Mayben Crabbe	Saskatchewan; Lillian Pinay	New Brunswick; Jannah Levi-Ward
Wrestling - Female 90 kg	Saskatchewan; Kaylan (Lanie) Daniels	British Columbia; Tristina Howse	Eastern Door & the North; Wenhniseriiostha Goodleaf
Wrestling - Male 100 kg	Florida; Samuel Micco	Wisconsin; Brandon King	Saskatchewan; Myles Bellegarde
Wrestling - Male 115 kg	New York; Shaerod Rodgers	Saskatchewan; Kalin Langford	Newfoundland and Labrador; Josh Dyke
Wrestling - Male 130 kg	Wisconsin; Alonzo Haack	Ontario; Adam Cameron-Land	Eastern Door & the North; Tehahokentha Mccomber
Wrestling - Male 42 kg			
Wrestling - Male 46 kg	Wisconsin; Darius Hawkins	British Columbia; Ethan Parkinson	(None - only other entry did not compete)
Wrestling - Male 50 kg	Eastern Door & the North; Jason-Guy Luneau	Manitoba; Christian Sanderson	British Columbia; Connor Mills
Wrestling - Male 54 kg	British Columbia; Kye Mills	New Brunswick; Seth Peter-Paul	Saskatchewan; Riley Icton
Wrestling - Male 58 kg	Saskatchewan; Gabriel Regnier	British Columbia; Ottis-James Crabbe	Newfoundland and Labrador; Marcus Organ
Wrestling - Male 63 kg	Saskatchewan; Cole Sanderson	Wisconsin; John Crawford	Newfoundland and Labrador; Aaron Pater
Wrestling - Male 69 kg	Wisconsin; Joshua Ryckman	Nova Scotia; Kody Francis	British Columbia; Jayden Iversen
Wrestling - Male 76 kg	British Columbia; Daniel Coels	Saskatchewan; Trevor Bannerman	Ontario; Misheen-Meegwan Shawanda
Wrestling - Male 85 kg	Eastern Door & the North; Nicholas Styres	Wisconsin; Justice Blackhawk	Colorado; Tom Kerwin Jr.
