= Tait McKenzie Centre =

Sports venue in Canada

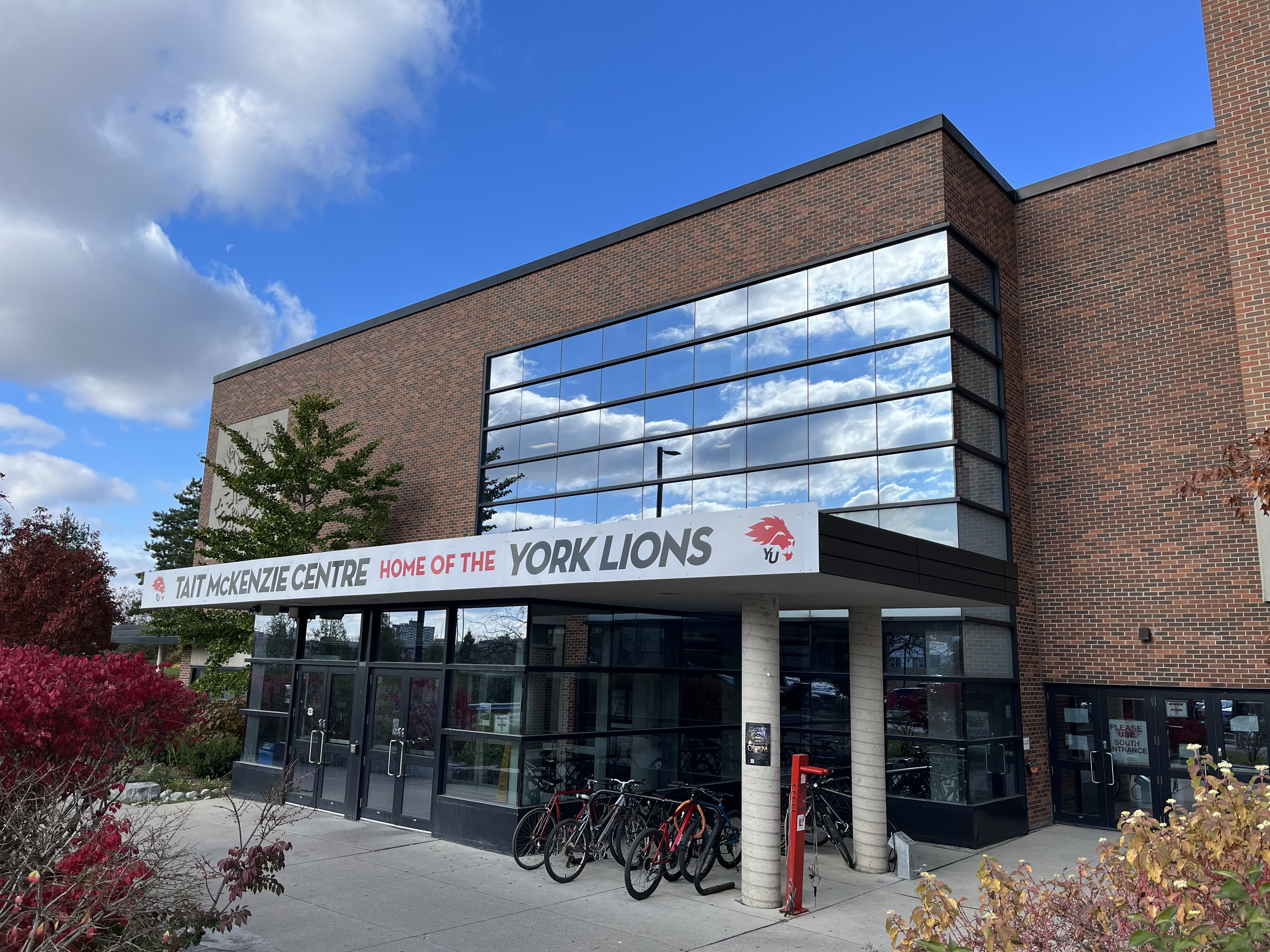

- Location in Toronto Location in Ontario Location in Canada
- Location: Toronto, Ontario
- Coordinates: 43°46′27.9″N 79°30′34.4″W
- Owner: York University
- Capacity: 1,200

Construction
- Built: mid-1960s
- Opened: 1966

Tenant
- York Lions

The Tait McKenzie Centre is an athletic facility located in Toronto, Ontario, Canada at York University. The building is named for R. Tait McKenzie, a renowned sculptor, doctor, soldier, physical educator, and athlete.

The building was based on the overall campus design concept in the 1960s under the joint venture UPACE (with John B. Parkin Associates, Shore and Moffat and Partners, Gordon S. Adamson and Associates). The facility consists of 45 cardio machines, four gymnasiums and a 25-metre (82 ft) swimming pool, among other amenities.

The York University badminton, basketball, volleyball, swimming and water polo teams use this facility as their venue. The facility hosted the basketball and volleyball competition of the 2017 North American Indigenous Games.
