= Toronto Varsity Blues men's soccer =

Men's soccer team of the University of Toronto

- Founded: 1879; 147 years ago+
- University: University of Toronto
- Head coach: Ilya Orlov (Since 2019 season)
- Conference: OUA; East Division
- Location: Toronto, Ontario, Canada
- Stadium: Varsity Stadium (capacity: 4,000)
- Nickname: Varsity Blues
- Colors: U of T Blue and white
Home	Away

U Sports National Championship titles
- 1988

U Sports National Championship appearances
- 1972, 1982, 1986, 1988, 1990, 1996, 1998, 2002, 2004, 2005, 2006, 2009, 2010, 2011, 2015, 2016, 2025

Conference tournament championships
- 1904, 1905, 1906, 1907, 1908, 1909, 1910, 1911, 1913, 1914, 1919, 1920, 1921, 1923, 1929, 1932, 1933, 1935, 1938, 1939, 1945, 1946, 1947, 1948, 1949, 1950, 1951 (West), 1953, 1954, 1955, 1956 (West), 1957, 1958 (West), 1959, 1960 (West), 1962 (West), 1963 (West), 1964, 1965, 1966, 1967, 1968, 1972, 1976, 1982, 1986, 1988, 2002, 2010, 2025

The Toronto Varsity Blues Men's Soccer is a Canadian intercollegiate soccer team founded in 1879. They represent the University of Toronto. The program operates in the Ontario University Athletics conference of U Sports, and the team competes in the East Division of the OUA. The Varsity Blues play their home games at Varsity Stadium, a 4000-seat stadium in downtown Toronto on the University of Toronto St. George campus.

The Varsity Blues captured one National Championship in 1988. The 1988 National Championship team has since been inducted into the Varsity Blues Hall of Fame. The Varsity Blues won 49 provincial OUA Championships with the most recent one in 2010. The Varsity Blues won the Argo Cup in the Red and Blue Bowl in 2013.

In January 2019, Ilya Orlov was appointed as the new Head Coach after serving as the Lead Assistant Coach for 4 years under Anthony Capotosto's tenure.

== History ==
=== Beginnings (1884) ===
==== 1880–84: Before the Committee ====
The Varsity mentions that, as early as 1880, the University College Associated Football Club competed against the Knox College, Collegiate Institute, and Medical School club teams. By the following year, the team was practicing regularly and travelling as far as Berlin (Kitchener, ON) for a tournament. While these early teams appeared to have practiced regularly on Front Campus, an actual organized club would not be formed until the spring of 1884.

==== 1884: Association Football Committee ====
The founding of this organized team can be traced to an Association Football Committee meeting on Tuesday, March 11, 1884, at 5 PM.

During the "well-attended" meeting, a motion was put forward to set aside two days of the week for a "professional" team to practice. This team would consist only of players selected by the committee.

One member opposed, arguing that it was "not desirable that the majority of the member [who won't be on the professional team] should sacrifice their [time] for the maintenance of this professional team". Another argued that this professional team should "practice on the prairie at the back of the University (referring to Back Campus) and leave the beautiful lawn for the rest of the members [who would not be on the varsity team]". The motion was passed and the Varsity team was formed, with the concession that all members would be allowed to train with the "professional" team during the two weekly practices.

The annual fee was raised to 50 cents and W.H. Irving was named as the President.

During the meeting, the club acknowledged member and player E.M. Hughes, who died recently from typhoid fever. The meeting also raised the need for the formation of an Inter-collegiate Association with the recommendation to include: Queen's College from Kingston, Victoria College from Cobourg, as well as Knox and University Colleges from Toronto.

==== 1885–1890: The University of Toronto Athletic Association ====
In the spring of 1885, the team was invited to Kingston to play against Queens, finishing the inaugural season with 6 wins and 2 draws with 14 goals forward and 2 goals against.

At the start of the next school year in the fall of 1885, the team had seven members who were also part of the Canadian International Football Club – and were in Newark, NJ competing.

In 1886, the Varsity Blues were to play Victoria College (then located in Cobourg) for the "Championship of Toronto," however the game was snowed out and a winner was never decided. At the end of that season, a letter-to-the-editor first appeared in the Varsity petitioning for the formation of an Athletic Association similar to that seen in McGill and Ottawa.

By fall 1887, the Varsity Blues had a regular First Eleven and Second Eleven playing regular games against Trinity Medical School and Toronto Medical School. There were still complaints that so few games were being played because of the scarcity of teams in the area.

In the spring of that school year, a meeting was held between the representatives of the Rugby, Soccer, Basketball, and Cricket clubs as well as the Gymnasium Association and Annual Sports Committee to unite them all under a single body: the Athletics Association. This association would charge $2 (later agreed to be $1) from each student's fees to be put toward general care of the lawn and other properties, as well as to act as final arbiters of conflict among the committees and support any of the clubs in times of financial troubles.

It wasn't until March 1891 that a draft constitution was put forth for the formation of the University of Toronto Athletic Association. This was readily supported by the soccer committee.

In that same season, the Varsity Blues defeated Grand Trunk Club of Montreal and were self-proclaimed "Champions of Canada". Later they travelled by train to Detroit and Chatham and won both those games 3–1.

=== Ernie Glass (1963–1968) ===
==== 1963: A businessman named Ernie Glass ====
In September 1963, Blues star-forward Bobby Lewis introduced a Toronto businessman named Ernie Glass as the new head coach of the Blues. Glass had coached the Toronto City Reserve team and was a former player himself in Edinburgh, Scotland. He had ten returning Blues players that year, including top-scorer Keith Murphy, Jeff Mahon, Urs Maag, Bobby Lewis, Bill Troost, and Peter Haynes. The Varsity Blues won the Blackwood Trophy after a 4–3 home win and a 2–2 away draw against McGill but came up short in the Toronto & District Association championship with a 1–1 draw against McMaster near the end of the season, leaving them tied for second in the league standings. This was star player Bobby Lewis' last year as a Blue. He was invited on trial with Chelsea F.C. in England in March 1964 after the season ended and went on to attend graduate school in Wales.

==== 1964: A thinking man's team ====
In 1964, only 6 members had returned from the previous year's team. Among them were Pat Terrelonge, Bill Troost, Dom Dente, and Nick Walker. Newcomers included future Varsity Blues soccer coach Jim Lefkos, Andy Pastor, "King" Ghartey, and Austris Liepa. Coach Glass described the squad as a "thinking man's team" and the "youngest in a number of years". The Varsity Blues finished first in the regular season standings, capturing the Toronto & District Association trophy and going undefeated in the process. As for the Blackwood Trophy, the Varsity Blues and McGill Redmen were deemed co-winners after the final game ended 0–0, even after extra-time. Jim Lefkos led the team in scoring with 11 goals.

==== 1965: The best college soccer team ====
By the 1965 season, the league split into two divisions: Université de Montréal, McGill University, and Queen's University in the East division and the University of Toronto, University of Western Ontario, University of Guelph, and McMaster University in the West division. Prior to the season, Glass said of his roster that he's "never seen so much talent in a group of college kids like this". There were nine returning players (Austris Liega, Dom Dente, Bill Troost, Pat Terrelonge) as well as rookies Ormond Mendes, Frank Soppelsa, and Bill Nepotiuk. Jim Lefkos was not a part of the 1965 team. In the middle of their undefeated season, University of Western Ontario coach Julius Payne said, "Toronto has the best college soccer team I've ever seen outside of England". Toronto went undefeated in the West division and then retained the Blackwood Trophy on Nov 12, 1965, after defeating the East division winners, Queen's University, 6–1 in the final at Varsity Stadium.

==== 1966: Blues keep rolling ====
The following season saw the return of the same Blues roster with the exception of Terrelonge and Captain Dom Dente, who both graduated. Les Clarke joined the team from McGill, while Jim Kalman, Bert Halsall, and Frank Cappuccitti joined as rookies. The Varsity Blues went undefeated in the 1966 West Division, only drawing 3–3 at home against Guelph on the Back Campus Field. They finished the regular season in first place and defeated McGill University at home and away to capture the Blackwood Trophy for the third year in a row. At one practice, Coach Glass told the Varsity newspaper "that a team of Blues' calibre could achieve their record without a coach". At the same time, the Varsity Blues players knowingly smiled at one another as they ultimately knew Glass' role in their triumphs.

==== 1967: Four in a row ====
The University of Waterloo and Université Laval joined the West and East divisions, respectively. This increased the size of the league to five teams in the West and four in the East. As for Glass, his entire team had returned for another year. In addition, Jim Lefkos had rejoined the Varsity Blues after missing the previous two seasons, as well as rookies Ron Muir, John Gero, and Jim Laverty. Glass said, during try-outs, that "many good players are going to be cut this year...[as an] indication of how strong we are". In a preseason exhibition, the Varsity Blues defeated a team of ex-Toronto City players 8–3 – a team which included Bobby Nicol and Alan Harvey. Blues goalkeeper Edwin Stach compared this Blues team to his former University of Western Ontario squad: "there is no comparison [ to his old team Western ]. At Western, we practiced only two nights per week while [in Toronto] we are out almost every day. Also, I'm sure if the coach at Western had the players that Blues cut this season, he would be mighty happy." Glass described his team as "at least top 20 in Ontario" and many of the more experienced Varsity Blues players felt the team would finish at least mid-table in the Ontario National League – the semi-pro league.

The Varsity Blues won the East division with an 8–0–0 record, including a home and an away win against McGill University. Lefkos and Soppelsa were the team's leading scorers for the year. On a cold and rainy Saturday afternoon at Varsity Stadium in front of "100 stoich fans", the Varsity Blues defeated the Queens' Golden Gaels – the undefeated team from the West division – 4–0 to retain the Blackwood Trophy for the fourth year in a row. Senior players Alan Cragg, Austris Liepa, and Garth Rothwell all graduated at the end of the year.

==== 1968: End of an era ====
In what was to be Glass' final year at the helm of the team, the Varsity Blues had lost half their regular starters from the prior year. Returning to the fold were only Lefkos, Soppelsa, Sereda, Nepotiuk, Taylor, and Gero. While Miles Sosa, Ken Cancellera, and goalkeeper Bernie D'Abreau were the crop of rookies. When speaking on his last four undefeated seasons, Glass said, "I don't take much credit because these guys are good to start." He added that "while most university teams have 1 or 2 good players, the Varsity Blues are uniformly strong". The Varsity Blues started off the season with a string of exhibition losses. They lost 1–0 and 8–1 to the Toronto contingent of the Canadian World Cup squad, as well as 2–1 against the Toronto Emeralds of the Toronto & District League premier division. The four-year regular season unbeaten streak ended the following game when they lost the home opener 4–3 to Guelph University. But, with the help of Jim Lefkos' 18 goals, the Varsity Blues won six of the remaining seven regular season games to clinch the West division Championship and a berth in the OQAA final against Université de Montréal in Montreal.

After three feet of snow covered Montreal on the weekend of Nov 16, the game was almost cancelled. However, "U of M officials changed their minds at the last moment, cleared the playing surface of all but six inches of the icey white stuff, painted field markings on the snow (in Blue no less) and the show went on." On a sunny Saturday afternoon, the Varsity Blues won the game 12–1, with Jim Lefkos scoring 6 and Soppelsa adding another three, capturing the Blackwood Trophy for a fifth straight time. Lefkos and star-defender and captain Eric Sereda shared the Charles Oster Trophy – symbolic of the team's Most Valuable Player as voted by the players. In December 1968, The Varsity headline read, "Soccer Title May Have Marked End of Era". The article contrasted the departing veterans to the new class of players: "the 'down and dirty' the night before and 'up and at em' the next morning veterans are almost all gone. The new 'milk and cookie' players are here. They have a tough act to follow". This was the last year that the Blues won back-to-back OUA (OQAA at the time) titles.

=== Bob Nicol (1969–1980) ===
==== 1969: The personable Bob Nicol ====
The 1969 team lost seven regular starters, including Lefkos, Sereda, Nepotiuk, Taylor, and D'Abreau. They also lost their coach, Ernie Glass, who stepped down to go on a football sabbatical in England. Bob Nicol, described as a "personable fellow", took over in his stead. Nicol had experience with the defunct Toronto Falcons and was at the time a player-coach with Ukraina of the semi-pro National League. In his first year with the Blues, his team consisted of Soppelsa, Gero, Cancellara, Kalman, and Sosa, as well as new players Trevor Wilson, Peter Mucalov, Andy Rode, John Cobby, and Sam Cesario.

The Varsity Blues won all four exhibition games in the pre-season, including a 2–0 win against York. By October 25, they were still undefeated – tying three games and winning two – and were in a three-way tie for first place with only three games left. They won two of the remaining three games and the lost final one, 3–2, McMaster Marauders. McMaster clinched the OQAA West division title. Gero led the Varsity Blues, scoring with 10 goals. In a postseason article, The Varsity summarized the Blues' 1969 season: "[it is] unlikely that Toronto will ever dominate OQAA soccer the way it has in the past. All the teams in the Western circuit have improved rapidly".

==== 1970: A season that aged like fine wine ====
"Like good wine, the 1970 Soccer Blues improved with age," read The Varsity after the 1970 season. In Nicol's second year in charge, there were only four returning veterans: Ken Cancellara, Miles Sosa, John Cobby, and Ersin Ozerding. The rookies that year were Tony Bowker, Bruno Bruni, Ed Carter, Ken Franco, Mike Moores, Vito Polera, Mario Da Rosa, Dave Evans, and Tony Lavelle. Followed by what was regarded as the team's "longest pre-season in their 45-year history", the Varsity Blues started off with a 4–4 draw at home vs Guelph. Three games into the eight-game season, they had a win, a loss, and a draw. "The season's turning point came at Hamilton where the [eventual champions] Mac Marauders were grateful to obtain a late equalizing tally after the Varsity Blues had put it all together for the first time," read The Varsity, describing the team's improvement in form midway through the year. After that, the Blues won two, drew one, and needed a win against the McMaster Marauders in the final game of the season. The Varsity Blues drew 1–1 and finished third. Mac went on to win the West division. Ozerding led the team with 7 goals, and captain John Cobby won team MVP.

At the end of 1970, it was announced that next year's Blackwood Trophy winner would go on to represent the OQAA (now the OUA) in the first-ever CIAU National Championships – playing the other Canadian intercollegiate division champions. In December 1970, an ad ran in The Varsity informing the student body that the "Blues are determined to regain [their past status as OUA champions]...to help accomplish this, the team will initiate an off-season training program this Saturday". Anyone interested in participating in the first-ever Blues off-season training was asked to "meet in the main locker room of Hart House tomorrow at 10:00AM". Coach Nicol expected the loss of only one or two veterans for the following season.

==== 1971: A new home called Varsity Stadium ====
By the start of their third year under Nicol, the Varsity Blues had only lost 2 regular season games but still had not won the West division title. The core of the team returned in 1971, including Ozerding, Cobby, Bruni, Polera and Cancellera. The rookies that year were Ian Wylie, Bob Cazzola, Herby Dubsky, Bernie McEvoy, Donato Cellucci, Joe Dattollico, Lou Donofrio, John Pickles, Andy Ranachin and Malcolm Brown. After winning a pre-season tournament in Oneonta, New York, the team beat the Waterloo Warriors in the season opener and then triumphed against Buffalo State in another exhibition game. The Buffalo media called the Varsity Blues the "Canadian Champions" – even though Memorial had won the CIAU Championship the year before. The Varsity Blues then tied Western before winning five straight times to clinch the West division title.

Their opponent in the OQAA final was Laurentian University, who had won the East division with 7 wins and only a single tie. The game was played at Varsity Stadium in early November with "cold temperatures, rain and chill north wind". The Varsity Blues lost the Blackwood Trophy 3–2. Laurentian went on to represent the Ontario University Athletics against Alberta, Loyola University and the defending champions Memorial in the 1971 CIAU Championships. One Blue was so upset after the game that "as the two sides left the pitch, [he] ran up to a linesman, spat in his face, and stole his signal flag". This was the first season where the Varsity Blues had played the entirety of their home schedule at Varsity Stadium – whereas, in previous years, home matches were on either Front Campus or Back Campus.

==== 1972: First visit to the national championships ====
The 1972 squad was a mix of old and new players: Mario Da Rosa, Vito Polera, Vince Ierullo, Bob Cazzola, Tim Burns, Joe Dattolico, Bruno Bruni, as well as a Peter Hillier, Ian Harris, Eugene Konarsky, Ed Cortes and John Cobby. By 1972, the OUAA soccer East division included Ryerson, Queen's, York, Trent, and Carleton, while the West was made up of McMaster, Toronto, Waterloo, Western, Guelph, Laurentian, and Brock. Captained by Cazzorla, the Varsity Blues opened the season with a 3–0 win against Waterloo at Varsity Stadium. After five games played, the Varsity Blues had won three and drawn two and had only allowed 2 goals against. Eight games in, they had six wins and two draws and still only 3 goals against. The crucial game against McMaster was played at Varsity Stadium – the winning team assured of the West division title. The Marauders had 40 goals forward, the most in the league, while the Varsity Blues had the least against. The Varsity Blues won 1–0. In the final weekend of the regular season, the Varsity Blues defeated Guelph and Laurentian to finish atop the West division table with a 9–0–2 (W–L–T) record and 31 goals for and 7 against.

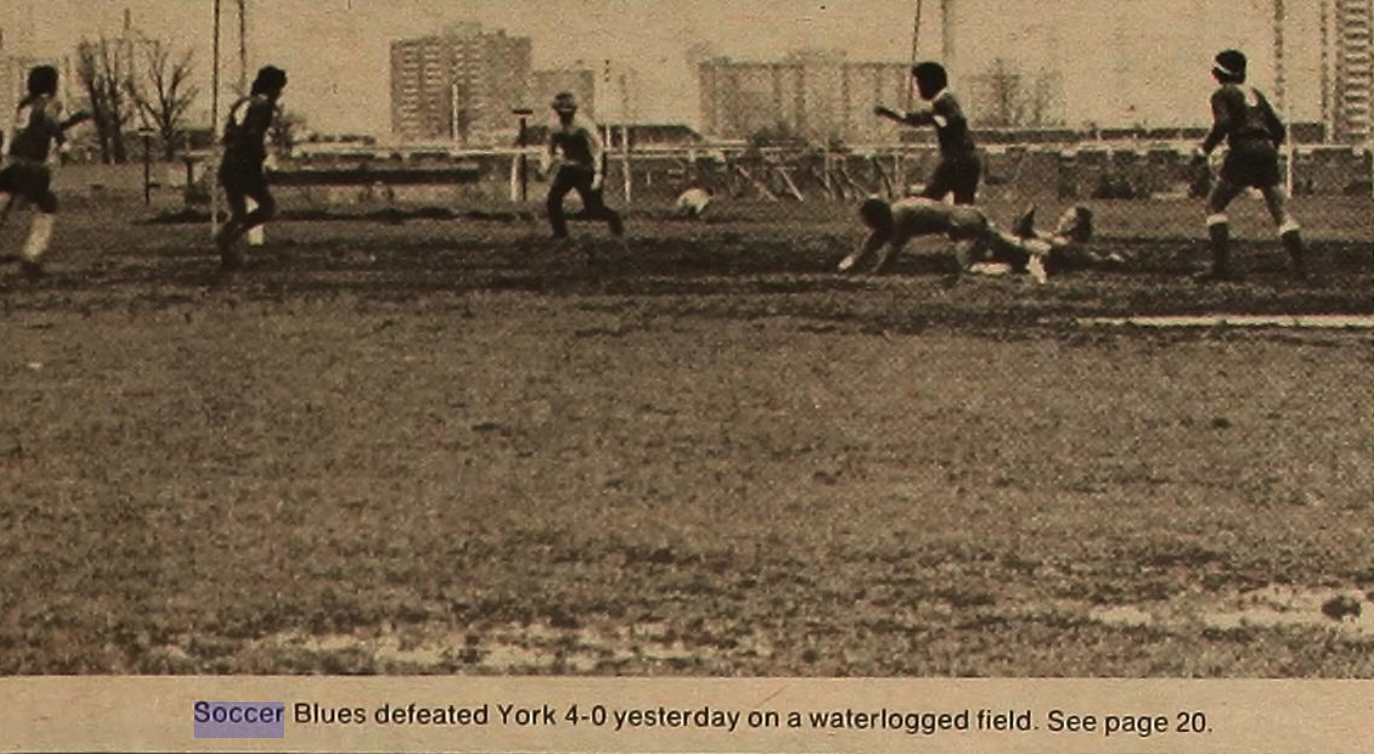
Blues defeat York University 4–0 at York University in the 1972 OUAA Final

The following weekend, on a York University field described by The Varsity (newspaper) as just "rain and mud", the Varsity Blues defeated York in the OUAA final. They clinched a Nationals semi-final berth against Alberta. The Varsity said that "even York's twelfth man on the field – a huge defensive puddle halfway between the York goal and the centre line – offered little aid [to York in limiting the 4–0 Blues lead]".

In the Varsity Blues first ever appearance at CIAU Nationals, they were defeated 2–0 by the Alberta Golden Bears at York University. This was their first defeat of the season. The Toronto school newspaper mentioned that the Varsity Blues had a "their first flat day [of the season]" and that "Alberta deserved its victory". The Golden Bears would go on to win in the final and become the 1972 National Champions.

==== 1973: Second best to the Voyageurs ====
Looking to retain the OUAA title, the Varsity Blues had a large core of returning players: Captain Tim Burns, John Cobby, Vince Ierullo, Peter Hilier, Vito Polera, Carmen Marcanonio, Robert Judd, Bruno Bruni, and Alenn Carmancio. The Varsity Blues lost the previous year's leading goal-scorer, Mario Da Rosa. After going scoreless in their first 270 minutes of exhibition and league games, Coach Nicol attributed this to it being the "first year in many that a goal scorer of Da Rosa's [big and strong] mould is lacking". After a 1–0 home-opener loss to Mac and then a 1–1 tie against Guelph, the Varsity Blues would win the next seven of nine games, tying two (both against the eventual champions Laurentian Voyageurs) and losing none. Trailing behind Laurentian Voyageurs in the West Division standings, their birth to the 1973 OUAA Final hinged on a win against McMaster University in the last game of the regular season. The Varsity Blues were up 1–0 with fifteen minutes to go. The Varsity describes the turning point of the game: "a hopeful and innocuous high [McMaster] lob down the middle caused the damage. Ignoring [Blues goalkeeper] Judd's call to leave it [Blues defender] Burns sought instead to nod the ball back towards [Judd]…[and past him]…the McMaster centre forward was left with the easy task of converting the goal." The Varsity Blues were unable to add another goal, and the game finished 1–1. The Laurentian Voyageurs won the West division and the OUAA Championship – while Loyola College (now Concordia University) won the 1972 CIAU National Championship. Striker Vince Ierullo and goalkeeper Bob Judd shared the Charles E. Oster Trophy (the team's MVP as voted by the players).

==== 1974: Ineligible players to start the season ====
The start of the 1974 season had five of the Blues' starting players – including goalkeeper Jack Brand, defender Tim Burns as well as captain Geoff Crewe – OUAA eligibility challenged because they participated in the North American Soccer League over the summer. Only Crewe was eventually allowed to play. Rounding out the team that year were newcomers Yannis Vassiliou, Mike Hendrickes, Rudi Kovacko, Bern Lecerf, Mike Lloyd, Ian McCluskey, Jude Robinson, Igor Ivanisevic, and Ivan Perusco, as well as returning players: Vince Ierullo, Dave Evans, and Phil Oldfield. The Varsity Blues defeated the eventual champions McMaster in their season-opener. Six games into the season, the Varsity Blues were in first place, with four wins, a loss, and a tie.

The Varsity Blues would go on to lose the next four games, including a home loss and an away loss against Western, as well as a 4–1 defeat versus Waterloo at Varsity Stadium. After the Waterloo game, The Varsity summarized the reasoning behind the Varsity Blues' poor performance thus far: "[since] the average calibre of play throughout the league has continued to rise over the years, it was perhaps inevitable that any Blues team containing less talent than its predecessors would be hard put to maintain [the Blues] traditional high standing. For various reasons, this year's squad has [very few] players of superior ability".

In the final game of the season, the Varsity Blues defeated the new Western Division champions McMaster, 5–2 in Hamilton. McMaster would go on to win the OUAA, then lose both games at CIAU Nationals. Crewe was awarded the Charles E Oster Trophy, while Vassiliou was the team's leading scorer. The team's Year-in-Review looked forward to 1975: "With only two players scheduled not to return next year, the club can mature into a more resilient team given the right attitude and fewer injuries. Conceivably, if the four players who were ruled ineligible [this year] are reinstated next year, this mediocre season will be the last for a quite a while."

== Head coaches ==
Head coaches since 1963
Coach	Years	Seasons	Win–loss–tie	OUA Championships	National Championships
Ernest Glass	1963–1968	6	41–4–3	6	—
Bob Nicol	1969–1980	12	69–32–16	2	0
Jim Lefkos	1981–2002	22	186–67–60	4	1
John Vidovich	2003–2004	2	7–16–3	1	0
Carmine Isacco	2005–2006	2	22–7–3	0	0
Anthony Capotosto	2007–2018	12	135–53–27	1	0
Ilya Orlov	2019 – present	5	29–17–10	0	0

== Seasons ==
Note:

1. Past results, and statistics are provided since 2004 are courtesy of the OUA and OUA Archives

2. Awards and statistics prior to 2004 are courtesy of the University of Toronto Archives

=== Team performances ===
Season	Head Coach	Won	Lost	Tied	OUA Season	OUA Playoffs	U Sports Nationals
1963	Ernest Glass	5	2	1	3rd	Gold	—
1964	Ernest Glass	5	0	1	1st	Gold	—
1965	Ernest Glass	6	0	0	1st	Gold	—
1966	Ernest Glass	6	0	1	1st	Gold	—
1967	Ernest Glass	8	0	0	1st	Gold	—
1968	Ernest Glass	6	2	0	1st	Gold	—
1969	Bob Nichol	4	1	3	3rd	—	—
1970	Bob Nichol	2	1	4	3rd	—	—
1971	Bob Nichol	6	1	1	1st	Silver	—
1972	Bob Nichol	9	0	2	1st	Gold	Semi-finals
1973	Bob Nichol	7	1	4	2nd	—	—
1974	Bob Nichol	6	5	1	4th	—	—
1975	Bob Nichol	5	5	0	6th	—	—
1976	Bob Nichol	7	2	1	3rd	Gold	—
1977	Bob Nichol	4	4	1	6th	—	—
1978	Bob Nichol	5	3	1	4th	—	—
1979	Bob Nichol	7	1	1	2nd	—	—
1980	Bob Nichol	2	6	2	9th	—	—
1981	Jim Lefkos	2	5	3	9th	—	—
1982	Jim Lefkos	9	0	1	1st	Gold	Semi-finals
1983	Jim Lefkos	6	0	6	3rd	—	—
1984	Jim Lefkos	2	6	4	6th	—	—
1985	Jim Lefkos	5	5	2	5th	—	—
1986	Jim Lefkos	7	2	3	2nd	Gold	Silver
1987	Jim Lefkos	7	2	3	1st	—	—
1988	Jim Lefkos	10	1	1	1st	Gold	Gold
1989	Jim Lefkos	10	1	1	2nd	—	—
1990	Jim Lefkos	9	1	2	1st	—	Semi-finals
1991	Jim Lefkos	5	4	1	3rd	—	—
1992	Jim Lefkos	8	3	1	3rd	—	—
1993	Jim Lefkos	8	1	3	2nd	—	—
1994	Jim Lefkos	8	1	3	2nd	—	—
1995	Jim Lefkos	6	3	3	3rd	—	—
1996	Jim Lefkos	5	2	5	4th	—	Group Stage
1997	Jim Lefkos	8	1	3	2nd	—	—
1998	Jim Lefkos	9	1	4	2nd	—	Group Stage
1999	Jim Lefkos	9	2	3	1st	—	—
2000	Jim Lefkos	9	1	2	1st	—	—
2001	Jim Lefkos	8	2	2	1st	—	—
2002	Jim Lefkos	4	2	4	1st	Gold	4th place
2003	John Vidovich	0	10	0	—	—	—
2004	John Vidovich	5	2	3	1st	Silver	Group Stage
2005	Carmine Isacco	7	1	2	1st	Silver	Silver
2006	Carmine Isacco	8	3	3	3rd	Silver	Quarter-finals
2007	Anthony Capotosto	8	3	3	2nd	Quarter-finals	—
2008	Anthony Capotosto	10	1	3	2nd	4th place	—
2009	Anthony Capotosto	11	1	2	1st	Silver	4th place
2010	Anthony Capotosto	10	1	3	3rd	Gold	4th place
2011	Anthony Capotosto	10	2	2	4th	Silver	Quarter-finals
2012	Anthony Capotosto	7	5	2	4th	Quarter-finals	—
2013	Anthony Capotosto	5	4	5	5th	Quarter-finals	—
2014	Anthony Capotosto	11	3	2	2nd	Bronze	—
2015	Anthony Capotosto	11	3	2	2nd	Bronze	Quarter-finals
2016	Anthony Capotosto	12	2	2	2nd	Bronze	Quarter-finals
2017	Anthony Capotosto	10	2	4	2nd	Quarter-finals	—
2018	Anthony Capotosto	11	4	1	3rd	Quarter-finals	—
2019	Ilya Orlov	11	4	3	4th	Bronze Medal Game	—
2021	Ilya Orlov	6	4	1	—	Quarter-finals	—
2022	Ilya Orlov	5	5	3	—	—	—
2023	Ilya Orlov	7	4	3	—	Quarter-finals	—
2024	Ilya Orlov	9	3	1	1st, East	Quarter-finals	—
2025	Ilya Orlov	10	1	1	1st, East	Gold	6th place

=== Leading scorers ===
Here are all-time leading scorers by season.

Season	Player name	Games	Goals
1998	Omar El-Behairy	14	12
2009	Nordo Gooden	14	8
2010	Alexander Raphael	12	8
2011	Mario Kovacevic	11	11
2012	Mario Kovacevic	11	9
2013	Mario Kovacevic	13	8
2014	Kilian Elkinson	10	11
2015	Nirun Sivananthan	15	6
2016	Lukas MacNaughton	15	7
2017	Jack Wadden	13	11
2018	Anthony Sousa	13	9
2019	—	—	—

== Award winners ==
=== Major national award winners – U Sports ===
These individuals have won major national awards.

- Mario Kovacevic – 2014 U Sports Community Service Award
- Mike Bialy – 2006 U Sports Player of the Year
- Theo Zagar – 1997 U Sports Player of the Year
- Coz Zambazis – 1988 U Sports Championship MVP
- Jim Lefkos – 1986 U Sports Coach of the Year

=== Major provincial award winners – OUA East ===
These individuals have won major provincial awards.

OUA major awards since 2004
Season	OUA East MVP	OUA Rookie of the Year	OUA Coach of the Year	OUA East Community Service Award
2004	—	—	John Vidovich	—
2005	Eric Tse	—	—	—
2006	Mike Bialy	—	—	—
2007	Mike Bialy	—	—	—
2008	—	—	—	Nordon Gooden
2009	—	—	—	—
2010	Darragh McGee	Ezequiel Lubocki	—	Lawrence Buchan
2011	Darragh McGee	—	—	Nicolas Girard
2012	—	—	—	—
2013	—	—	—	—
2014	Kilian Elkinson	—	—	Mario Kovacevic
2015	—	Yousef Helmy	—	—
2016	—	—	—	—
2017	—	—	—	—
2018	—	—	—	—

OUA Coach of the Year Winners Prior to 2004:

- 2003 – John Vidovich
- 2001 – Jim Lefkos
- 1993 – Jim Lefkos
- 1988 – Jim Lefkos
- 1986 – Jim Lefkos (co-winner)

OUA Most Valuable Players Prior to 2004:

- 2003 – Robert Rupf

OUA Rookie of the Year Prior to 2004:

- 2002 – George Davis
- 2001 – Sean Myers

=== Minor award winners – OUA East and U Sports ===
OUA & U Sports Minor Awards Since 1979
Season	First Team All-Canadian	Second Team All-Canadian	OUA First Team Allstar	OUA Second Team Allstar
1977	—	—	Peter Uremovich	—
1978	—	—	Pat Pitters Milan Lukovich	—
1979	Dave Secco Dieter Wendling	—	Bob Simcoe Dieter Wendling Chris Lasovich	—
1980	—	Len Visconti	Lenny Visconti Peter Kovacs	—
1981	—	—	—	—
1982	—	—	Nitin Kawale Jim Kyriacou Frank Minchella Lenny Visconti Riccardo Zane	—
1983	Ricardo Zane	—	Roman Mushka Bill Mackrell Riccardo Zane	—
1984	Ricardo Zane	—	Bill Mackrell Coz Zambasis Raccardo Zane	—
1985	—	—	Guido Geisler Coz Zambasis	—
1986	Mark Purdy Pat Cubellis	—	Carlo Vilardo Guido Geisler Mark Purdy Coz Zambasis Pat Cubellis	—
1987	Mark Purdy	—	Guido Geisler Mark Purdy Dino Mastrogianis	—
1988	Coz Zambazis Pat Cubellis	—	Dominic Ientile Rob Pacas Guido Geisler John Diniz Dino Mastrogianis Coz Zambasis Pat Cubellis	—
1989	Peter Sarantopoulos	George Argyropoulos	Guido Geisler Peter Sarantopoulos Chris Collie John Diniz Pat Cubellis	—
1990	Peter Sarantopoulos	George Argyropoulos	Tim Rosenfeld Peter Sarantopoulos Tom Lazarou John Diniz George Argyropoulos	—
1991	Peter Sarantopoulos	—	Tim Rosenfeld Peter Sarantopoulos Marco DeLuca Enzo Sallese	—
1992	—	George Argyropoulos	Steve Albanese Marco DeLuca Enzo Sallese George Argyropoulos	—
1993	—	Steve Albanese	Steve Albanese Guido Spinelli Joe Demiglio Tom Kouzmanis	—
1994	Tom Kouzmanis	Steve Albanese	Theo Zagar Steve Albanese Stuart Black Tom Kouzmanis	—
1995	Joe Demiglio	—	Joe Demiglio Suhail Mirza Ferdinando Tantalo	—
1996	Joe Demiglio Stuart Black	—	Victor Maia Joe Demiglio Stuart Black Hieu Quach Eric Puig	—
1997	Theo Zagar Joe Demiglio Eric Puig	—	Theo Zagar Joe DeMiglio Anthony Capotosto Stuart Black Suhail Mirza Eric Puig	—
1998	—	Jonathon Robilliard	Omar El-Behairy Jonathan Robillard	—
1999	—	Tom Kiriakou Logan Purdy	Anthony Capotosto Logan Purdy Tom Kiriakou Sakis Rizos Robert Rupf Joey Ciano	—
2000	Anthony Capotosto	—	Anthony Capotosto Logan Purdy	—
2001	Anthony Capotosto	—	Yuri Elkaim Anthony Capotosto Oday Khaghani Jeff Ormonde Tom Kouzmanis Joey Ciano	—
2002	Yuri Elkaim	—	Yuri Elkaim Robert Rupf Jeff Ormonde Sean Myers	—
2003	Robert Rupf	—	Robert Rupf George Davis Sean Myers Michel D'Angelo	—
2004	—	Mike Bialy Sean Myers	Mike Bialy Sean Myers	George Davis Faiz Karim
2005	Eric Tse	—	Eric Tse Mike Bialy Joe Rini Kyle Hall	George Davis
2006	Mike Bialy	Eric Tse Evan Milward	Alen Keri Eric Tse Mike Bialy Joe Rini Evan Milward	Mario Nallira
2007	Mike Bialy	—	Joe Rini Mike Bialy	Dustin Chung Jose D'Amora Evan Milward
2008	—	—	Yannis Gianniotis Dustin Chung Mario Nallira Niko Pesa	Lawrence Buchan
2009	Yannis Gianniotis	—	Yannis Gianniotis Dylan Bams Alex Raphael	John Smits Mario Nallira Nordo Gooden
2010	Darragh McGee Nordo Gooden	—	Darragh McGee Nordo Gooden Ezequiel Lubocki Alex Raphael	John Smits Dylan Bams
2011	Darragh McGee	—	Darragh McGee Scott Nesbitt Ezequiel Lubocki Mario Kovacevic	Dylan Bams
2012	—	—	Dylan Bams Ezequiel Lubocki	Darragh McGee Mario Kovacevic Adrian Dannel
2013	—	—	Ezequiel Lubocki	Mario Kovacevic Veljko Lukovic Devon Bowyer
2014	Kilian Elkinson	—	Devon Bowyer Lukas MacNaughton Ezequiel Lubocki	Kilian Elkinson Mario Kovacevic
2015	—	Lukas MacNaughton	Rab Bruce-Lockhart Devon Bowyer Lukas MacNaughton	Nirun Sivananthan
2016	—	—	Devon Bowyer Lukas MacNaughton Nikolay Saveliev Nikola Stakic	Mark Rogal Harry Michelis
2017	—	Devon Bowyer Lukas MacNaughton	Devon Bowyer Lukas MacNaughton Nikola Stakic Marko Mandekic	Nirun Sivananthan Kenny Lioutas
2018	—	—	Jae Jin Lee Kenny Lioutas	Marko Mandekic Nikola Stakic

== Notable alumni ==
- Oladapo Afolayan – English footballer – FC St. Pauli
- Kilian Elkinson – Bermudan national team player (formerly with Toronto FC)
- Lukas MacNaughton – Canadian Premier League (Pacific FC) and MLS player (Toronto FC and Nashville SC)
- Chris Mannella – Canadian Premier League player with Atletico Ottawa (formerly with Toronto FC, Ottawa Fury and York9)
- Anthony Capotosto – Toronto FC Academy director
- Carmine Isacco – York 9 FC First-Assistant Coach
- Gabe Gala – former MLS player with Toronto FC
- John Smits – former NASL goalkeeper with FC Edmonton, NASL Golden Glove Award winner
- Theo Zagar – former goalkeeper for the Toronto Lynx
