= Tim Burns =

Tim Burns may refer to:

== Politicians ==
- Timothy Burns (Wisconsin politician) (1820–1853), lieutenant governor of Wisconsin, 1851–1853
- Timothy Burns (Louisiana politician) (born 1957), member of the Louisiana House of Representatives from St. Tammany Parish
- Tim Burns (Michigan politician) (born 1973), Democratic Oakland County commissioner

== Others ==
- Tim Burns (businessman) (born 1968), Pennsylvania businessman
- Tim Burns (footballer) (born 1947), Canadian soccer player
- Tim Burns (writer), Canadian television writer and producer
