= 2006 CIS Men's Soccer Championship =

The 2006 CIS Men's Soccer Championship Finals were held from 9 to 12 November 2006 at the University of Alberta in Edmonton, Alberta. It consisted of 8 teams from the various conferences under the Canadian Interuniversity Sport.

== All-Canadians ==
First Team (1–11) and Second Team (12–22) with school and hometown. Note: Flags indicate national team as defined under FIFA eligibility rules; some limited exceptions apply. Players may hold more than one non-FIFA nationality.

No.	Pos.	Nation	Player
1	GK		Gérardo Argento (Montreal)
2	DF		Adam Legg (Western)
3	DF		Michel Mana Nga (Laval)
4	MF		Johan Le Goff (Montreal)
5	MF		Mike Bialy (Toronto)
6	MF		Ricardo Marquez (Cape Breton)
7	MF		Ryan Haughn (Dalhousie)
8	FW		Junior Castrillon-Rendon (Alberta)
9	FW		Steve Frazao (UBC)
10	FW		Mark Bennett (Brock)
11	FW		Cole McFarlane (Victoria)

No.	Pos.	Nation	Player
12	GK		Srdjan Djekanovic (UBC)
13	DF		Eric Tse (Toronto)
14	DF		Diaz Kambere (Trinity Western)
15	DF		Eduardo Farias (Saint Mary's)
16	MF		Nick Perugini (Trinity Western)
17	MF		Rafael Moniz (Brock)
18	MF		Matt Thomson (UPEI)
19	MF		James Scholefield (McGill)
20	FW	CAN	Evan Milward (Toronto (Kingston, ON))
21	FW		Kwame Osei (Cape Breton)
22	FW	MLI	Boubacar Coulibaly (Montreal (Bamako, Mali))

== Nationals ==
Along with host Alberta Golden Bears, the teams that qualified for the National Finals are UNB Varsity Reds, Trinity Western Spartans, Montreal Carabins, Western Ontario Mustangs, St. Mary's Huskies, Toronto Varsity Blues and Laval Rouge et Or. The Alberta Golden Bears won the championship in a 1–0 game against the Trinity Western Spartans.
