= Carmine Isacco =

Canadian soccer coach and retired player (born 1970)

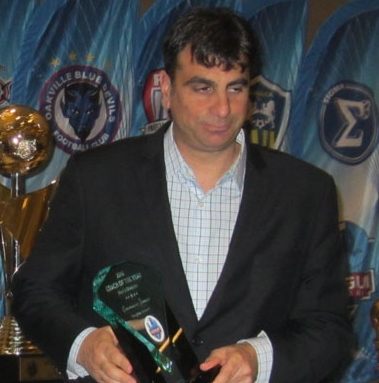
- Isacco in 2016

Personal information
- Full name: Carmine Isacco
- Date of birth: September 20, 1970 (age 56)
- Place of birth: Toronto, Ontario
- Height: 6 ft 3 in (1.91 m)
- Position: Goalkeeper

College career
Years	Team	Apps	(Gls)
1989–1992	Maryland Terrapins		

Senior career*
Years	Team	Apps	(Gls)
1992–1994	Toronto Italia		
1996–1999	Milwaukee Rampage	75	(0)
1996–1997	Toronto Shooting Stars (indoor)	26	(0)
1996–1999	Milwaukee Wave (indoor)	30	(0)
1999	Rochester Rhinos	0	(0)
1999–2000	Edmonton Drillers (NPSL) (indoor)	14	(0)
2000	Toronto Lynx	3	(0)
2000–2001	Buffalo Blizzard (indoor)	3	(0)
2002	Toronto Supra	2	(0)

Managerial career
- 2002: Toronto Supra
- 2005–2006: Vaughan Shooters
- 2005–2006: Toronto Varsity Blues
- 2007: Toronto FC (goalkeeper coach)
- 2007–2008: York Lions
- 2008: Italia Shooters
- 2010–2012: SC Toronto
- 2014–2018: Vaughan Azzurri
- 2019: York9 FC (first assistant coach)
- * Club domestic league appearances and goals

Carmine Isacco (born September 20, 1970) is a Canadian soccer coach and retired player. He is currently the head coach for the York Lions varsity men's soccer team of the OUA.

== Playing career ==
=== College years ===
In 1989, Isacco entered the University of Maryland, College Park where he was a Soccer America Magazine freshman All-American goalkeeper. Over his four seasons with the Terrapins, he was named to the All-ACC first team three times and was the Terrapins team captain as a senior in 1992. He then spent time with the Canadian Olympic Team and competed at the 1993 World University Games.

=== Professional career ===
Isaaco turned professional in 1992 with the Toronto Italia in the National Soccer League. In his first season with the club he was named Goalkeeper of the Year, and was also named a Canadian all-star three times. In 1996, he moved to the Milwaukee Rampage of the USISL, and won the league title in 1997. He was selected to the All USISL Select First Team. In the fall of 1996, he played indoor soccer with the Toronto Shooting Stars in the National Professional Soccer League.

On October 16, 1997, he signed a two-year contract with the Milwaukee Wave, where he primarily served as a backup to Victor Nogueira. After having been released by the Rampage halfway through the 1999 outdoor season he signed with the Rochester Rhinos in August, 1999. He then moved to the Edmonton Drillers for the 1999-2000 NPSL season. On June 20, 2000, the Toronto Lynx signed Isacco.

In the fall of 2000, he signed with the Buffalo Blizzard where he served as a backup for Bryan Finnerty. The Blizzard folded at the end of the season and the Kansas City Comets selected Isacco in the dispersal draft, but chose not to sign with the team. In 2002, he signed with Toronto Supra in the Canadian Professional Soccer League, where he primarily served as a backup goalkeeper for the club, and finishing off the season as the team's head coach.

== Managerial career ==
=== CPSL/CSL ===
In 2002, he made the transition into managing as a player-coach for Toronto Supra in the Canadian Professional Soccer League. In 2005, he was appointed the head coach for Vaughan Shooters. In his debut season with Vaughan he secured the Eastern Conference title, and reached the CPSL Championship final, where they were defeated 2-1 by Oakville Blue Devils. In 2006, he resigned as head coach for Vaughan in order to fully devote to his coaching responsibilities with the Toronto Varsity Blues. He returned to the CSL to manage the Italia Shooters for the 2008 season. The season concluded with the Shooters winning their second division title, and reached the semifinals in postseason.

In 2010, Isacco returned to the Supra organization under the name Portugal FC. After the merger with feeder club the Toronto Eagles the club became known as SC Toronto, and he resumed his coaching duties for the 2011 season. Throughout the season he achieved the organization's second regular season title since 2004, and finished with the league's best offensive record. In 2012, SC Toronto promoted him to the position of technical director. While serving as head coach for SC Toronto he was selected as the assistant coach for the Canada under-20 soccer team under Valerio Gazzola for the 2011 CONCACAF U-20 Championship.

=== U Sports ===
In June 2005, Isacco was hired to coach the University of Toronto men's soccer team, the Varsity Blues. With the Varsity Blues, he led the team to OUA silver medals in both 2005 and 2006, also capturing a CIS silver in 2005.

On March 26, 2007, Isacco was appointed as the head coach for the York University men's soccer team, the York Lions. Under Isacco's tenure as head coach, the York Lions' have amassed 7 OUA conference championships (2007, 2013, 2014, 2015, 2017, 2018) and 4 U Sports national championships (2008, 2010, 2014, 2015). The Lions' 2008 U Sports championship was York's first national championship in any sport in 18 years, and their first soccer championship since 1977.

=== Major League Soccer ===
On January 10, 2007, Isacco resigned as the men's soccer head coach for the Varsity Blues and accepted a position as an assistant goalkeeping coach with Toronto FC, serving under head coach Mo Johnston.

Before the start of the 2008 TFC season, with Johnston moving upstairs to fill the role of director of football, Isacco's contract was not renewed by Toronto FC.

=== League1 Ontario ===
On May 29, 2014, he was appointed the head coach for Vaughan Azzuri of the League1 Ontario. Throughout his tenure with Vaughan he won the double in 2016, and 2018. He was also named League1 Ontario Head Coach of the Year in 2015, and 2016.

=== Canadian Premier League ===
On July 27, 2018, York9 FC of the Canadian Premier League announced their coaching staff for the 2019 Canadian Premier League season, naming Isacco as the first assistant coach of the team behind head coach Jim Brennan. On February 4, 2020, it was announced that Isacco was replaced by Paul Stalteri as York9 FC's first assistant coach.
