= Panos Polyviou =

Greek footballer

Personal information
- Place of birth: Greece
- Position: Midfielder

Senior career*
Years	Team	Apps	(Gls)
1968–1971	Toronto Hellas		
1971	Toronto Metros	1	(0)
1973	Toronto Hungaria		
- * Club domestic league appearances and goals

Panos Polyviou is a Greek former footballer who played as a midfielder.

== Career ==
Polyviou played in the National Soccer League in 1968 with Toronto Hellas. He returned to play with Hellas for the 1969 season, and the 1970 season. The following season he was traded to Toronto Metros of the North American Soccer League for Jim Lefkos. In 1973, he returned to the NSL to play with Toronto Hungaria. In his debut season with Hungaria he assisted in securing the double (NSL Championship & NSL Cup), and featured in the NSL Cup final against Toronto Croatia.
