= Kilian Elkinson =

Bermudian footballer (born 1990)

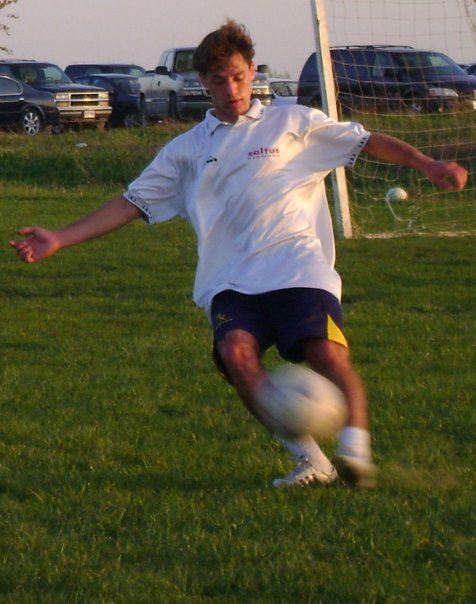
- Elkinson in 2009

Personal information
- Full name: Kilian Joel Elkinson
- Date of birth: 2 April 1990 (age 36)
- Place of birth: Hamilton, Bermuda
- Height: 5 ft 7 in (1.70 m)
- Positions: Striker; left back

Youth career
- PHC Zebras
- North Village Rams

College career
Years	Team	Apps	(Gls)
2008	Toronto Varsity Blues	8	(0)
2011–2014	Toronto Varsity Blues	39	(15)

Senior career*
Years	Team	Apps	(Gls)
2008	Toronto FC	0	(0)
2016	North Toronto Nitros	13	(15)
2016–2019	Robin Hood FC		
2019	Sydney Uni	3	(0)

International career
2009–2017	Canada Maccabi		
2015	Canada Universiade	4	(1)
2015–2019	Bermuda	10	(0)
Medal record
Representing Canada
Men's soccer
Maccabiah Games
Third place	2013
- * Club domestic league appearances and goals

Kilian Joel Elkinson (born 2 April 1990) is a Bermudian former footballer who played for the Bermuda national team.

== Early life ==
Elkinson played football for the youth teams of PHC Zebras and North Village Rams in Bermuda. In 2005, he moved to Canada to further his educational opportunities.

== University career ==
In 2008, Elkinson attended the University of Toronto, where he played for the men's soccer team, followed by later returning to the men's team in 2011, playing through 2014. On September 3, he scored a hat trick in a 5-1 win over the UOIT Ridgebacks, earning him OUA Athlete of the Week honours. In September 2014, he was named the Varsity Blues Athlete of the Week for two consecutive weeks. On October 1, 2014, he scored a brace in a 2-0 victory over the UOIT Ridgebacks. At the end of the 2014 season, he led the OUA East in goals with 11 and was named the OUA East MVP, an OUA East Second Team All-Star, and a CIS First Team All-Star.

== Club career ==
In April 2008, Elkinson signed a developmental contract with Toronto FC in Major League Soccer. After only appearing in reserve team matches, he did not return to the club for the following season, following MLS's decision to end the MLS Reserve League.

In 2016, he played with the North Toronto Nitros in League1 Ontario. He was named to the mid-season All-Star Game. At the end of the season, he was named a league Second Team All-Star.

From 2016 to 2019 he played for Robin Hood FC in the Bermudian Premier Division.

In 2019, he played for Sydney Uni SFC in the Australian National Premier League NSW 3.

== International career ==
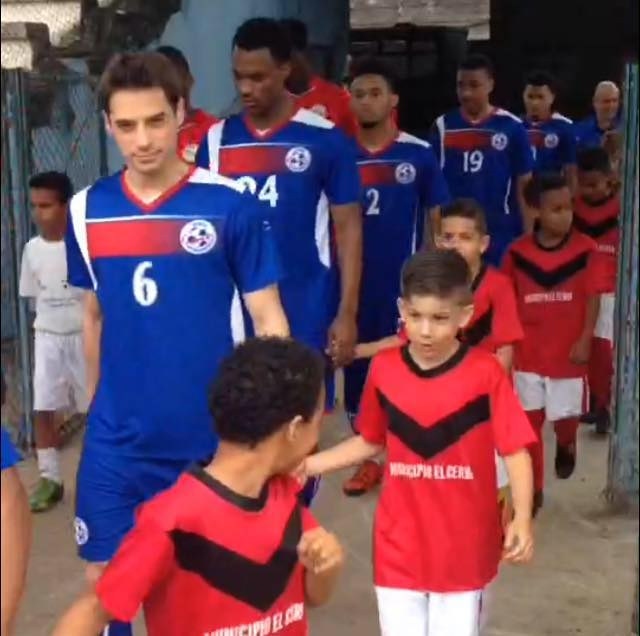
Elkinson (left) with Bermuda against Cuba in 2016

Elkinson was eligible to represent Bermuda, Ireland, Australia, and Canada at international level.

=== Bermuda ===
In 2003, Elkinson went on a two-week tour in Holland and Belgium with the Bermuda U13 team, where they played eight matches against local youth clubs. In 2008, he was set to join the Bermuda U20 for World Cup qualifiers, however, he was not able to join the squad due to passport issues. In June 2015, he earned his first international cap for the Bermuda national team in a friendly against Puerto Rico.

=== Canada ===
Elkinson also represented Canada at non-FIFA competitions. Through his Jewish heritage, he played with Canada at the 2009 Maccabiah Games, 2013 Maccabiah Games (winning a bronze medal), and the 2017 Maccabiah Games.

In 2015, Elkinson was named to the Canada Universiade team for the 2015 Summer Universiade.

== Legal career ==
In 2019, he began attending law school at the University of Sydney. In 2019, he was a member of a group of University of Sydney students who ranked equal first among Australian universities at the 26th Willem C Vis International Commercial Arbitration Moot Competition. He is currently a lawyer, eligible to practice in Australia, New Zealand, and Bermuda.

== Honours ==
Maccabi Canada

- Maccabiah Bronze Medal: 2013
