= Nikola Stakic =

Canadian soccer player (born 1998)

Personal information
- Date of birth: January 26, 1998 (age 28)
- Place of birth: Toronto, Ontario, Canada
- Height: 1.85 m (6 ft 1 in)
- Position: Defender

Youth career
- Scarborough Blizzard SC
- East York SC
- 2010–2011: Cherry Beach United
- 2012: North Toronto Nitros
- 2013–2017: Toronto FC

College career
Years	Team	Apps	(Gls)
2016–2021	Toronto Varsity Blues	77	(20)

Senior career*
Years	Team	Apps	(Gls)
2015–2017	Toronto FC III	30	(2)
2016	Toronto FC II	1	(0)
2018–2024	Alliance United FC	65	(22)
Total		96	(24)

Managerial career
- 2025: Alliance United FC
- 2026–: Unionville Milliken SC
- * Club domestic league appearances and goals as of August 18, 2024

Nikola Stakic (born January 26, 1998) is a Canadian soccer coach and former player who currently serves as the head coach of Unionville Milliken SC in the Ontario Premier League.

== Early life ==
Born in Toronto, Stakic began his career aged six playing for local side Scarborough Blizzard. He later joined the Toronto FC Academy.

== University career ==
Stakic attended the University of Toronto, playing for the men's soccer team from 2016 to 2021. He was a five-time OUA All-Star.

== Club career ==
In 2015, he began playing with Toronto FC III in League1 Ontario and the Premier Development League.

In 2016, Stakic was called up by Toronto FC II from the Toronto FC Academy. He made his professional debut in the USL on May 15, 2016 in a 2–0 defeat to Charleston Battery.

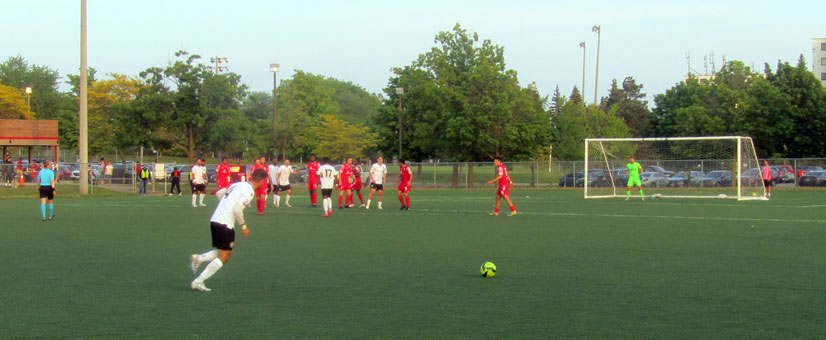
Nicola Stakic takes a free kick for Alliance United in 2023

In 2018, he began playing for Alliance United in League1 Ontario. In 2019, he was named the League1 Ontario Midfielder of the Year and a league First Team All-Star. In 2022, he was once again named league Midfielder of the Year and was named a First Team All-Star. In 2023, he was again named a First Team All-Star.

== International career ==
In 2013, Stakic made his debut in the Canadian youth program, when he was called up to a U15 national team camp. He was named to the U15 national team for the 2013 Copa de México de Naciones.

== Career statistics ==
As of August 18, 2024

Club	Season	League	League		Playoffs		League Cup		Total	
Club	Season	League	Apps	Goals	Apps	Goals	Apps	Goals	Apps	Goals
Toronto FC III	2015	Premier Development League	5	0	—		—		5	0
Toronto FC III	2016	Premier Development League	14	1	—		—		14	1
Toronto FC III	2017	League1 Ontario	11	1	—		?	?	11	1
Toronto FC III	Total		30	2	0	0	0	0	30	2
Toronto FC II	2016	USL	1	0	—		—		1	0
Alliance United	2018	League1 Ontario	9	0	1	0	?	?	10	0
Alliance United	2019	League1 Ontario	15	6	1	0	—		16	6
Alliance United	2021	League1 Ontario Summer Championship	5	2	—		—		5	2
Alliance United	2022	League1 Ontario	14	1	2	0	—		16	1
Alliance United	2023	League1 Ontario	16	11	—		—		16	11
Alliance United	2024	League1 Ontario Premier	6	2	—		0	0	6	2
Alliance United	Total		65	22	4	0	0	0	69	22
Career Total			96	24	4	0	0	0	100	24
