= Jim Lefkos =

Cypriot footballer

Personal information
- Full name: Demetrios Lefkos
- Place of birth: Cyprus
- Position: Forward

Youth career
- 1964–1969: Varsity Blues

Senior career*
Years	Team	Apps	(Gls)
1963–1965	Toronto Hakoah		
1966–1967	Toronto Hellas		
1969	Syracuse Scorpions		(22)
1970–1971	Rochester Lancers	14	(5)
1971	Toronto Metros	6	(0)
1971	Toronto Hellas		
- * Club domestic league appearances and goals

Demetrios "Jim" Lefkos is a retired Cypriot football (soccer) forward. He played professionally in the North American Soccer League and American Soccer League, where he led the league in scoring in 1969.

== Player ==
A native of Cyprus, Lefkos attended the University of Toronto where he played on the school's soccer team from 1964 to 1969. Lefkos led the team in scoring for three consecutive seasons during which the Varsity Blues won three OQAA championships. He was inducted into the school's Hall of Fame in 1999. In 1963, he played in the National Soccer League with Toronto Hakoah. He contributed a hattrick which secured the NSL Championship for Hakoah against Toronto Ukraina in the 1965 season. In 1966, he played with league rivals Toronto Hellas. He re-signed with Toronto for the 1967 NSL season.

In 1969, Lefkos signed with the Syracuse Scorpions of the American Soccer League. Lefkos led the league in scoring and was a First Team All Star. In 1970, he moved to the Rochester Lancers of the North American Soccer League. In 1971, he began the season in Rochester before being traded to the Toronto Metros. In late July, 1971 he was traded to former club Toronto Hellas for Panos Polyviou.

== Coach ==
Lefkos then became a physical education and health teacher as well as the boys' soccer coach at Danforth Collegiate and Technical Institute. In 1981, Lefkos, in addition to his high school responsibilities, became the head soccer coach of the University of Toronto men's soccer team. He coached the team to one national championship before retiring in 2002.
