= 1982 CIAU Men's Soccer Championship =

The 1982 CIAU Men's Soccer Championship was hosted by McGill University. The McGill Redmen won the gold medal game against the Victoria Vikings to claim the second men's soccer national championship in school history.

Some of the data is incomplete according to the 2008 CIS Soccer Almanac.

== All-Canadians ==
First Team(1-11) and Second Team(12-22) with school and hometown. Note: Flags indicate national team as defined under FIFA eligibility rules; some limited exceptions apply. Players may hold more than one non-FIFA nationality.

No.	Pos.	Nation	Player
1	GK	CAN	(school - hometown)
2	DF	FRA	
3	DF	CAN	John D'Ambrosio (McGill)
4	DF	CAN	Dickens St. Vil (McGill)
5	MF	CAN	Guy-Marie Joseph (McGill)
6	MF	CAN	
7	MF	CAN	
8	MF	CAN	
9	FW	CAN	
10	FW	CAN	
11	FW	CAN	

No.	Pos.	Nation	Player
12	GK	CAN	
13	DF	CAN	
14	DF	CAN	
15	DF	CAN	
16	MF	FRA	
17	MF	CAN	
18	MF	CAN	
19	FW	CAN	
20	FW	CAN	
21	FW	CAN	
22	FW	CAN	

== Nationals ==
Semi-final

McGill Redmen	2-0	UNB Red Shirts

Final

McGill Redmen	1-0	Victoria Vikings
