= McGill Redbirds soccer =

University Canadian soccer team

McGill Redbirds Soccer
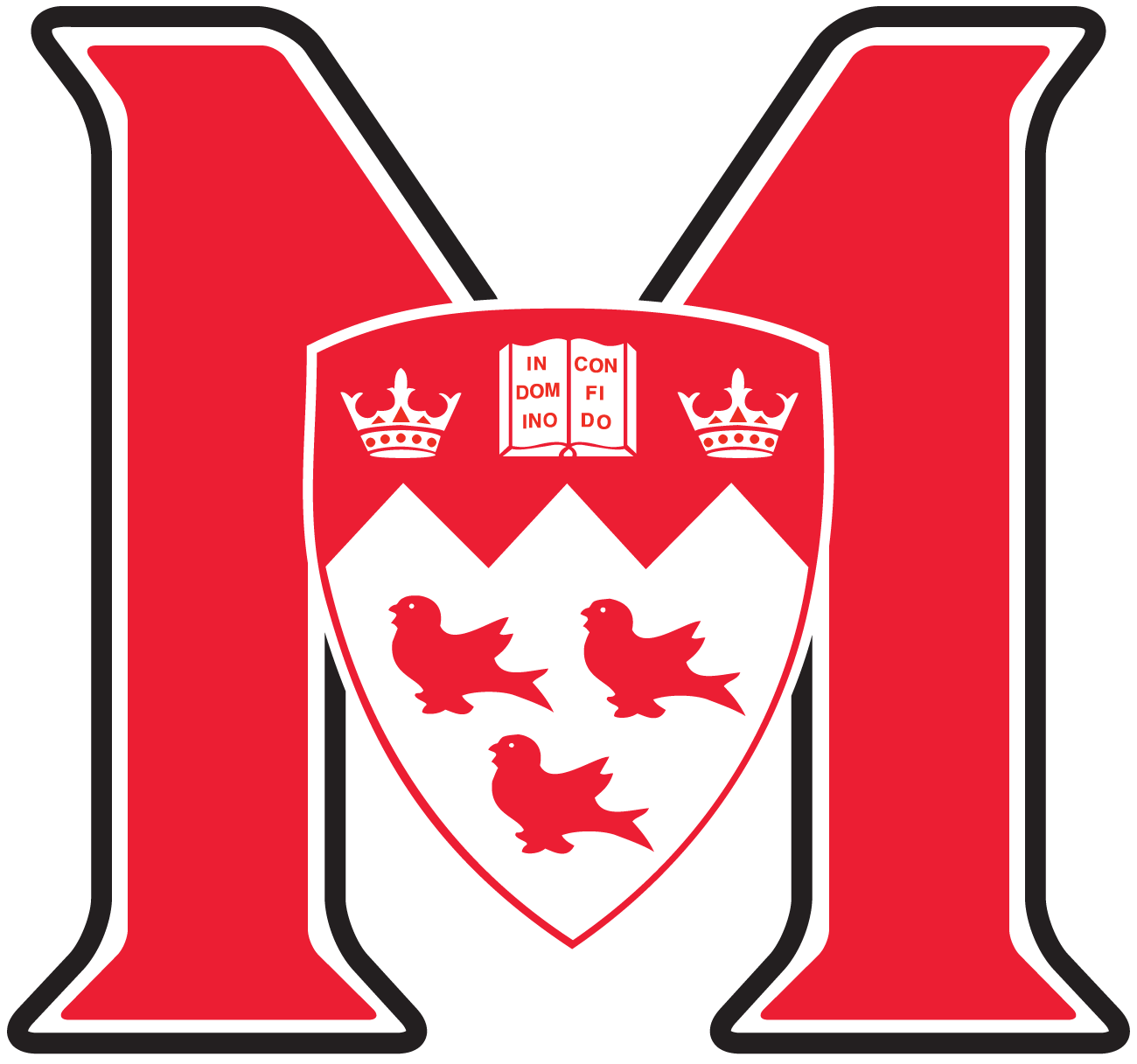
- Founded: 1898; 128 years ago
- University: McGill University
- Head coach: Marc Mounicot (14th season)
- Conference: RSEQ
- Location: Montreal, Quebec, Canada
- Stadium: Percival Molson Memorial Stadium (capacity: 23,420)
- Colors: Red and white
| Home | Away |

U Sports National Championship titles
- 1981, 1982, 1997

Conference tournament championships
- 1978, 1980, 1981, 1982, 1983, 1984, 1986, 1987, 1988, 1989, 1990, 1991, 1996, 1997, 1999, 2000, 2002, 2026

The McGill Redbirds soccer team is an intercollegiate varsity men's soccer team representing McGill University and competes in the RSEQ conference of U Sports.

Established in 1898, the program has won three U Sports national championships, in 1981, 1982, and 1997. The program also features 17 RSEQ conference championship winners.

== History ==
In the XIX century, sports were an important part of the Montreal community, with early forms of rugby, soccer (in summer), and ice hockey (in winter), an even baseball. McGill students used to participate in those sporting activities in late 1840s and early 1850s.

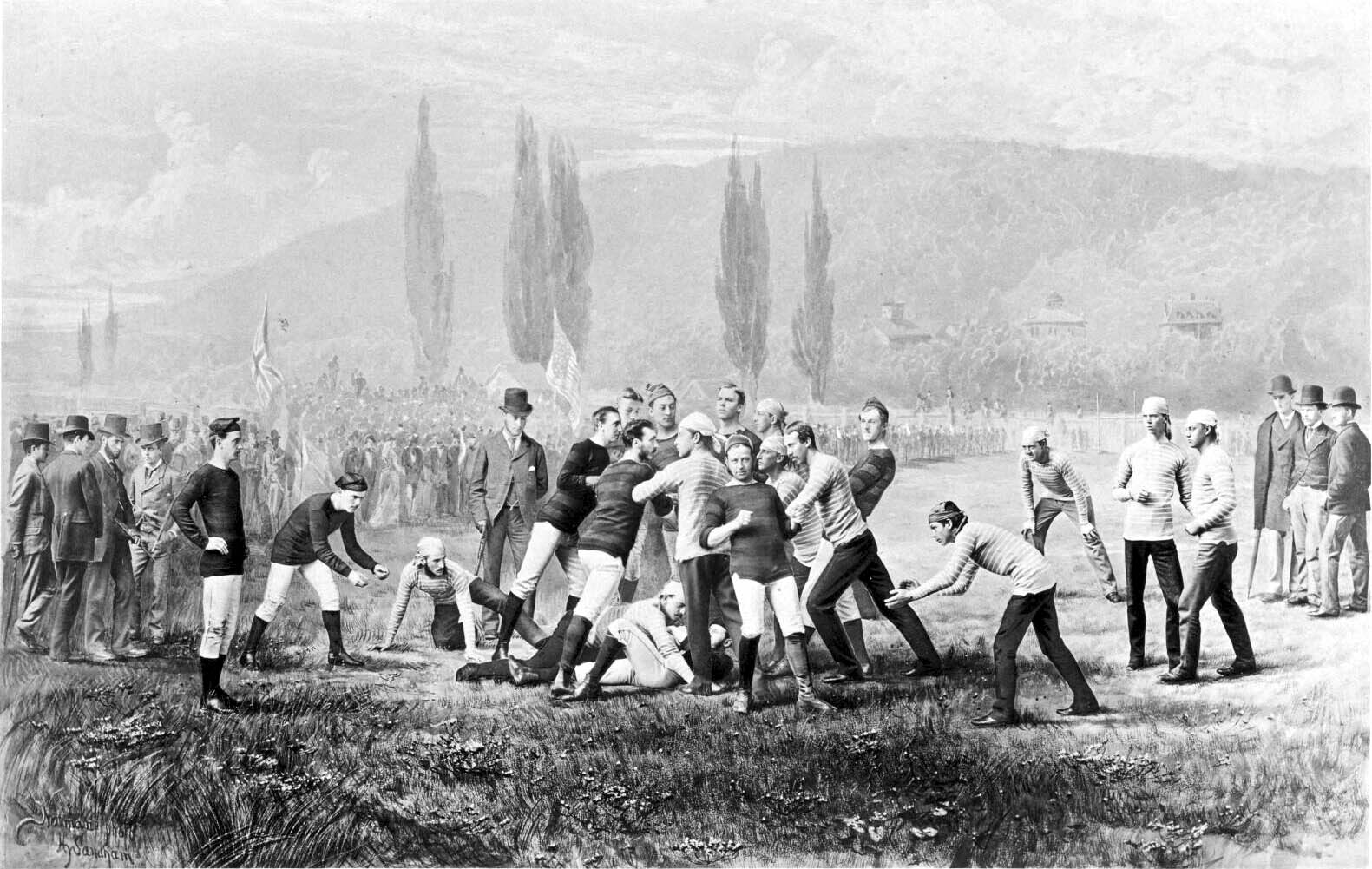
The game series vs Harvard University in 1874 was the first recorded game in any form of "football" played by McGill

Roots to any form of "football" at McGill can be traced to 1872, when McGill and US-based Harvard University met in the first North American style football game.

The McGill team travelled to Cambridge to meet Harvard. On May 14, 1874, the first game, played under Harvard's rules, was won by Harvard with a score of 3–0. The next day, the two teams played under "McGill" rugby rules to a scoreless tie. The games featured a round ball instead of a rugby-style oblong ball. This series of games represents an important milestone in the development of the modern game of American football. In October 1874, the Harvard team once again travelled to Montreal to play McGill in rugby, where they won by three tries.

Nevertheless, the first soccer team, i.e. the first squad playing under the Football Association rules was fielded in 1898, playing exhibition games and participating in local leagues such as the Montreal City and District League. Teams were composed of mostly medical students due to medicine was the only faculty operating during the season months (usually summer). Nevertheless McGill would not participate in intercollegiate competition until 1906, when the team joined forces with Queen's and the Toronto Universities for a round-robin tournament championship.

The program won their first national championship in 1981, after defeating Alberta 4–2 on penalties, following a scoreless regular time. One year later, McGill won their second consecutive title after a 1–0 to Victoria in the final.

The third and last to date title came in 1997, when McGill defeated British Columbia 5–4 on penalties after a regular time with no goals scored.

McGill had one of their most successful regular seasons in recent history in Fall 2018, finishing with a 5–4–3 Conference record, and placing fourth in the RSEQ conference. The team went on to lose to Montreal in the RSEQ playoffs.

== Players ==
The soccer program at McGill operates throughout the entire school year. In addition to the regular U Sports fall season, the men's team also compete in the RSEQ indoor season running from January to mid March.

=== Current roster ===
As of January 2026 Note: Flags indicate national team as defined under FIFA eligibility rules; some limited exceptions apply. Players may hold more than one non-FIFA nationality.

| No. | Pos. | Nation | Player |
|---|---|---|---|
| 1 | GK | CAN | Gavin McFee |
| 2 | DF | CAN | Hamza Salama |
| 3 | DF | SCO | Angus Logan |
| 4 | DF | CAN | Stuart Klenner |
| 5 | MF | CAN | Nathan Yee |
| 6 | DF | CAN | Gustave Therrien |
| 7 | FW | CAN | Maher Fares |
| 8 | MF | CAN | Luke Manara- |
| 9 | FW | CAN | Luke Rosettani |
| 10 | MF | ALG | Nassim Kemel |
| 11 | FW | CAN | Pedro Gulli |
| 12 | FW | SUI | Lefika Noko |
| 13 | MF | CAN | Elay Chartouny |
| 14 | DF | TAI | Loic Gilbert |

| No. | Pos. | Nation | Player |
|---|---|---|---|
| 15 | MF | CAN | William Popescu |
| 16 | MF | USA | Elias Farhat |
| 17 | MF | CAN | Jordan Persia |
| 18 | FW | USA | Maddox Bailey |
| 19 | MF | CAN | Samuel Armstrong |
| 20 | MF | ESP | Esteban Roy |
| 21 | FW | USA | Yusuke Sato |
| 22 | DF | CAN | Erik Apostu |
| 23 | MF | CAN | Romain Dallery |
| 24 | MF | UAE | Eloi Versieux |
| 25 | DF | FRA | Hugo Samy |
| 29 | GK | CAN | Emile LeBlanc |
| 30 | GK | CAN | Ludovyck Ciociola |

=== Notable players ===
Striker Mehdi Ibn Brahim and central midfielder Ramzi Saim were selected for the RSEQ All Star first team. Defender Chris Flores and striker Florian Bettelli were selected for the RSEQ Second Team and Rookie Team of the Year. Head Coach Marc Mounicot won the Coach of the Year in the RSEQ.

Ramzi Saim went on to gain a further accolade winning a place in the All Canadian Second Team of the Year whilst Florian Bettelli was selected for the All Canadian Rookie Team of the Year.

== Cocahes ==
=== Current staff ===
As of January 2026

| Position | Staff |
|---|---|
| Head coach | (France) Marc Mounicot |
| Assistant coach | Jeremy Fatines |
| Assistant coach | (France) Romain Delachoux |
| Goalkeeper coach | Florian Tertre |

== Honours ==
=== National ===
| Competition | Titles | Winning years |
|---|---|---|
| U Sports championship | 3 | 1981, 1982, 1997 |

=== Conference ===
| Conference | Competition | Titles | Winning years |
|---|---|---|---|
| RSEQ | Division I | 17 | 1978, 1980, 1981, 1982, 1983, 1984, 1986, 1987, 1988, 1989, 1990, 1991, 1996, 1997, 1999, 2000, 2002, 2026 |
