= Matt Thomson =

American computational biologist

Matt Thomson is an American computational biologist, academic, and entrepreneur. He works in the fields of computational biology, biophysics, and machine learning.

== Early life and education ==
Matt Thomson's academic journey began at Harvard University, where he pursued his undergraduate education and graduated magna cum laude with an AB in Physics in 2001.

Thomson continued at Harvard University for graduate studies in Biophysics, completing his Ph.D. in 2011. His doctoral research focused on the mathematical modeling and analysis of biochemical networks, aiming to understand the control mechanisms behind cellular decision-making processes.

After earning his Ph.D., Thomson received an independent fellowship at the University of California, San Francisco (UCSF), where he worked on developing mathematical methods to model cell fate determination and tissue self-organization.

== Research and career ==
Matt Thomson is a faculty member in the field of computational biology at the California Institute of Technology (Caltech). He is also the principal investigator of SPEC, the Beckman Center for Single Cell Profiling and Engineering at Caltech, and an investigator with the Heritage Medical Research Institute. During his tenure at Caltech, Thomson mentored several PhD students, including Guruprasad Raghavan, who later co-founded Yurts with him in 2022. His research group studies "living algorithms," focusing on the information processing strategies used by cells and organisms to interact with their environment. This interdisciplinary area includes computational biology, physics, machine learning, and neuroscience.

His research in bio-inspired machine learning algorithms, such as FIP, Herd, and spatial predictive coding, has contributed to advancements in neural network flexibility. In addition, he developed mathematical models for predicting cellular responses to external stimuli, including D-SPIN, Popalign, and ActiveSVM.

Additionally, Thomson's research includes the creation of optically programmable active materials by engineering light-switchable proteins integrated into cytoskeletal networks.

== Awards ==
Matt Thomson has received several awards and honors for his work in computational biology, machine learning, and systems biology. In 2019, he received the Packard Fellowship. He also received the NIH Early Independence Award in 2011. Additionally, Thomson received the NIH Transformative R01 in 2023 and the Okawa Research Award in 2020.

== Selected publications ==
- Ross, Tyler D.; Lee, Heun Jin; Qu, Zijie; Banks, Rachel A.; Phillips, Rob; Thomson, Matt (August 2019). "Controlling organization and forces in active matter through optically defined boundaries". Nature. 572 (7768): 224–229. arXiv:1812.09418. Bibcode:2019Natur.572..224R. doi:10.1038/s41586-019-1447-1. ISSN 1476-4687. PMC 6719720. PMID 31391558.
- Thomson, Matthew; Gunawardena, Jeremy (July 2009). "Unlimited multistability in multisite phosphorylation systems". Nature. 460 (7252): 274–277. Bibcode:2009Natur.460..274T. doi:10.1038/nature08102. ISSN 1476-4687. PMC 2859978. PMID 19536158.
- Thomson, Matt; Liu, Siyuan John; Zou, Ling-Nan; Smith, Zack; Meissner, Alexander; Ramanathan, Sharad (June 2011). "Pluripotency Factors in Embryonic Stem Cells Regulate Differentiation into Germ Layers". Cell. 145 (6): 875–889. doi:10.1016/j.cell.2011.05.017. PMC 5603300. PMID 21663792.
- Zhu, Meng; Cornwall-Scoones, Jake; Wang, Peizhe; Handford, Charlotte E.; Na, Jie; Thomson, Matt; Zernicka-Goetz, Magdalena (2020-12-11). "Developmental clock and mechanism of de novo polarization of the mouse embryo". Science. 370 (6522) eabd2703. doi:10.1126/science.abd2703. ISSN 0036-8075. PMC 8210885. PMID 33303584.
- Raghavan, Guruprasad; Thomson, Matt (2019). "Neural networks grown and self-organized by noise". arXiv:1906.01039 [cs.NE].
- Raghavan, Guruprasad; Tharwat, Bahey; Hari, Surya Narayanan; Satani, Dhruvil; Thomson, Matt (2022). "Engineering flexible machine learning systems by traversing functionally-invariant paths". arXiv:2205.00334 [cs.LG].
- Jiang, Jialong; Chen, Sisi; Tsou, Tiffany; McGinnis, Christopher S.; Khazaei, Tahmineh; Zhu, Qin; Park, Jong H.; Strazhnik, Inna-Marie; Hanna, John; Chow, Eric D.; Sivak, David A.; Gartner, Zev J.; Thomson, Matt (2026). "D-SPIN constructs regulatory network models from scRNA-seq that reveal organizing principles of perturbation response". Cell. 189 (13): 4159–4184.e35. bioRxiv 10.1101/2023.04.19.537364. doi:10.1016/j.cell.2026.04.028. PMC 13387596. PMID 42127893.
- Ross, Tyler D., Heun Jin Lee, Zijie Qu, Rachel A. Banks, Rob Phillips, and Matt Thomson. 2019. “Controlling Organization and Forces in Active Matter Through Optically-Defined Boundaries”. Nature 572 (7768): 224–29. doi.org/10.1038/s41586-019-1447-1
- Raghavan, G., Tharwat, B., Hari, S.N. et al. Engineering flexible machine learning systems by traversing functionally invariant paths. Nat Mach Intell 6, 1179–1196 (2024). doi.org/10.1038/s42256-024-00902-x
- Gornet, J., Thomson, M. Automated construction of cognitive maps with visual predictive coding. Nat Mach Intell 6, 820–833 (2024). doi.org/10.1038/s42256-024-00863-1
- Yang, F., Liu, S., Lee, H.J. et al. Dynamic flow control through an active matter programming language. Nat. Mater. (2025). doi.org/10.1038/s41563-024-02090-w
