= Tim Burns (footballer) =

Canadian soccer player

Personal information
- Date of birth: 10 July 1947 (age 79)
- Place of birth: England
- Position: Midfielder

Senior career*
Years	Team	Apps	(Gls)
1972–1975	Toronto Metros-Croatia	34	(2)
1975	Toronto Homer		
1976	Toronto Italia		
- * Club domestic league appearances and goals

Tim Burns (born July 10, 1947) is an English-born Canadian soccer player who played as a midfielder.

== Career ==
Burns played in the North American Soccer League with Toronto Metros in 1972. He would play with the Metros for four seasons in the NASL. For the remainder of the 1975 season he played in the National Soccer League with Toronto Homer. In 1976, he returned to the National Soccer League to play with Toronto Italia. He was called to the Canada Olympic soccer team camp in 1976.
