= Vroman (surname) =

Vroman is a Germanic surname. Notable people with the surname include:

- Akiva Vroman, Israeli geologist
- Ariel Vromen, film director
- Brett Vroman, American basketball player
- Jackson Vroman, American-Lebanese basketball player
- Leo Vroman (1915–2014), Dutch-American hematologist and poet
- Lisa Vroman, American lyric soprano and actress
- Peter Vroman, American Revolutionary War soldier

== See also ==
- Frahm, Frohm/Frohms, Frohman, From, Froman, Frome, Fromer, Fromm, Frommann, Fromme, Frommel, Frommelt, Frommer/Frommert, Froom, Froome, Frum, Frumer, Vroman, Vroom, Vrooman, Vroome, Vroomen/Vromen/Vroemen
- Viromandui
