= Frohman =

Frohman is a surname. Notable people with the surname include:

- Charles Frohman (1856–1915), American theatrical producer
- Daniel Frohman (1851–1940), American theatrical producer
- Dov Frohman, Israeli engineer
- Gustave Frohman (1854–1930), American theatrical producer
- Jesse Frohman, American photographer
- Philip H. Frohman (1887–1972), American architect

== See also ==
- Frahm, Frohm/Frohms, Frohman, From, Froman, Frome, Fromer, Fromm, Frommann, Fromme, Frommel, Frommelt, Frommer/Frommert, Froom, Froome, Frum, Frumer, Vroman, Vroom, Vrooman, Vroome, Vroomen/Vromen/Vroemen
