= Frommelt =

Frommelt is a German surname with main distibution in Germany, Switzerland, and Liechtehstein. Notable people with the surname include:

- Adolf Frommelt (1891–1964), Liechtenstein politician
- Andrew G. Frommelt (1921–2017), American politician
- Anton Frommelt (1895–1975), Deputy Prime Minister of Liechtenstein and President of the Landtag of Liechtenstein
- Christof Frommelt (1918–1987), Olympic cross-country skier from Liechtenstein
- Egmond Frommelt (1927–2019), Liechtenstein banker and politician
- Louis Frommelt (1943–2005), Olympic sport shooter from Liechtenstein
- Noah Frommelt (born 2000), footballer from Liechtenstein
- Noldi Frommelt (born 1931), Liechtenstein politician
- Paul Frommelt (born 1957), Olympic alpine skier from Liechtenstein, son of Christof
- Willi Frommelt (born 1952), Olympic alpine skier from Liechtenstein, son of Christof, brother of Paul

== See also ==
- Frahm, Frohm/Frohms, Frohman, From, Froman, Frome, Fromer, Fromm, Frommann, Fromme, Frommel, Frommelt, Frommer/Frommert, Froom, Froome, Frum, Frumer, Vroman, Vroom, Vrooman, Vroome, Vroomen/Vromen/Vroemen
