= Frommann =

Frommann is a German surname. Notable people with the surname include:

- Carl Friedrich Ernst Frommann, German publisher and bookseller
- Constantin Frommann (born 1998), German footballer
- Friedrich Johannes Frommann, German publisher, bookseller and politician

== See also ==
- Frahm, Frohm/Frohms, Frohman, From, Froman, Frome, Fromer, Fromm, Frommann, Fromme, Frommel, Frommelt, Frommer/Frommert, Froom, Froome, Frum, Frumer, Vroman, Vroom, Vrooman, Vroome, Vroomen/Vromen/Vroemen
