= From (surname) =

From is a Germanic surname, along with many other variants, derived from Middle High German vrum, vrom or Middle Low German vrōme , vrōm , vrām, vrāme, meaning , "strong, capable, brave, valiant" Notable people with the surname include: Notable people with the surname include:

- Al From (born 1943), American political strategist
- Friedrich Wilhelm Theodor From (1787–1857), Prussian lieutenant general
- Gideon From (1906–1968), Swedish banker and politician, M.P.
- Henry From (1926–1990), Danish footballer
- Isak From (born 1967), Swedish politician
- Martin Severin From (1825–1895), Danish chess master
- Per From (1856–1931), early Swedish bicycle manufacturer
- Sigfred From (1925–1998), Danish chess master

== See also ==
- Frahm, Frohm/Frohms, Frohman, From, Froman, Frome, Fromer, Fromm, Frommann, Fromme, Frommel, Frommelt, Frommer/Frommert, Froom, Froome, Frum, Frumer, Vroman, Vroom, Vrooman, Vroome, Vroomen/Vromen/Vroemen
