= Froman =

Froman or Fröman is a Germanic surname. Notable people with the surname include:

- Adam Froman (born 1987), American football player
- Bengt Fröman (born 1950), Swedish badminton player
- Darol Froman (1906–1997), American physicist
- David Froman (1938–2010), American actor
- Hadassah Froman, Israeli peace activist
- Ian Froman (1937–2024), South African-born Israeli tennis player and patron
- Jane Froman (1907–1980), American actress
- Margarita Froman (1890–1970), Russian ballet dancer
- Menachem Froman (1945–2013), Israeli rabbi
- Michael Froman (born 1962), American lawyer
- Ronne Froman (born 1947), American Navy officer
- Sandra Froman (born 1949), American activist and lawyer
- Wayne Froman, American actor

== See also ==
- Frahm, Frohm/Frohms, Frohman, From, Froman, Frome, Fromer, Fromm, Frommann, Fromme, Frommel, Frommelt, Frommer/Frommert, Froom, Froome, Frum, Frumer, Vroman, Vroom, Vrooman, Vroome, Vroomen/Vromen/Vroemen
