= Vroom (surname) =

Vroom or de Vroom is a Dutch surname. Notable people with the surname include:

- Hendrick Cornelisz Vroom (1566–1640), Dutch painter
- Cornelis Vroom (1591–1661), Dutch painter
- Peter Dumont Vroom (1791–1873), American politician and governor of New Jersey
- Hendrik Vroom (1850–1902), Gold Coast colonial official and businessman
- Frederick Vroom (1857–1942), Canadian silent-film actor
- Victor Vroom (1932–2023), Canadian-American business academic
- Peter Vroom, Australian actor who played Lance Smart in the soap opera Home and Away
- Siem Vroom, Dutch actor who has twice won the Louis d'Or (award)

== See also ==
- Frahm, Frohm/Frohms, Frohman, From, Froman, Frome, Fromer, Fromm, Frommann, Fromme, Frommel, Frommelt, Frommer/Frommert, Froom, Froome, Frum, Frumer, Vroman, Vroom, Vrooman, Vroome, Vroomen/Vromen/Vroemen
