= Frome (surname) =

Frome is an English toponymic surname associated with any populated places, rivers, or lakes named Frome. Notable people with the surname include:

- Andrea Frome, American computer scientist
- Edward Charles Frome (1802–1890), British Army officer, surveyor and colonial administrator
- Lenny Frome (died 1998), gambling author and video poker expert
- Milton Frome (1909–1989), American actor
- Norman Frederick Frome (1899–1982), ornithologist

== Fictional characters ==
- Protagonist from the 1911 American novella Ethan Frome

== See also ==
- Frahm, Frohm/Frohms, From, Frome, Fromer, Fromm, Fromme, Frommel, Frommer/Frommert, Froom, Froome, Frum, Frumer, Vroom, Vrooman, Vroome, Vroomen/Vromen/Vroemen
