= Froome =

Froome is a surname. Notable people with the surname include:

- Chris Froome (born 1985), British road racing cyclist
- Keith Froome (1920–1978), Australian rugby league player

== See also ==
- Frahm, Frohm/Frohms, From, Frome, Fromer, Fromm, Fromme, Frommel, Frommer/Frommert, Froom, Froome, Frum, Frumer, Vroom, Vrooman, Vroome, Vroomen/Vromen/Vroemen
