= Frum (surname) =

Frum is a Yiddish surname; frum means 'pious, observant'. Notable people with the surname inlude:

- Barbara Frum, Canadian journalist
- Danielle Frum or Danielle Crittenden, Canadian-American author and journalist, wife of David Frum
- David Frum, political commentator and journalist, son of Barbara
- John Frum, figure associated with cargo cults on the island of Tanna in Vanuatu
- Linda Frum, Canadian journalist, daughter of Barbara
- Murray Frum, Canadian real estate mogul

== See also ==
- Fruma
- Frumkin
- Frahm, Frohm/Frohms, Frohman, From, Froman, Frome, Fromer, Fromm, Frommann, Fromme, Frommel, Frommelt, Frommer/Frommert, Froom, Froome, Frum, Frumer, Vroman, Vroom, Vrooman, Vroome, Vroomen/Vromen/Vroemen
