= Froom =

Froom may refer to:

People

- Le Roy Froom (1890–1974), Seventh-day Adventist minister and historian
- Mitchell Froom (1953– ), musician and record producer
- Charlotte Froom (1986– ), guitarist of The Like

Other

- River Froom, a river in Bristol, England, now generally spelt Frome

== See also ==
- Frahm, Frohm, From, Fromer, Fromm, Fromme, Frommel, Frommer/Frommert, Frum, Frumer, Vroom, Vrooman, Vroome, Vroomen/Vromen/Vroemen
