= Listed buildings in Skåne County =

The following is a list of the listed buildings (Swedish: byggnadsminne) in Skåne County, Sweden.

== Bjuv Municipality ==
Image	Name	Premises	Number of buildings	Year built	Architect	Coordinates	ID
	Ekeby Bath House	Skromberga 12:2	1	1920		55.99830°N 12.97794°E	21300000014384
	Norra Vram rectory	Norra Vram 32:4	3	1816		56.08944°N 12.97560°E	21300000014882
	Vrams Gunnarstorp Castle	Vrams Gunnarstorp 2:1	6	1500s		56.10404°N 12.96835°E	21300000014884

== Burlöv Municipality ==
Image	Name	Premises	Number of buildings	Year built	Architect	Coordinates	ID
	Burlöv rectory	Burlöv 7:1	1	1774		55.63694°N 13.11239°E	21300000014372
	Gymnastics House at Hvilan	Åkarp 29:1	1	1884		55.65113°N 13.11568°E	21300000014374
	Kronetorp Windmill	Arlöv 7:16	2	1841		55.63160°N 13.09105°E	21300000014381

== Båstad Municipality ==
Image	Name	Premises	Number of buildings	Year built	Architect	Coordinates	ID
	Klinta House	Slättaröd 11:7		First half of the 1800s		56.39017°N 12.65355°E	21320000029707
	Skjulet	Torekov 98:1		First half of the 1800s		56.42638°N 12.62367°E	21320000029706
	Torekov Bath House	Torekov 98:1	1	1876		56.42698°N 12.62342°E	21000001648601
	Villa Sommarlek	Hemmeslöv 44:44	1	1936		56.43599°N 12.88186°E	21300000015040
	Ågegården	Boarp 2:22	4	1700s		56.43275°N 12.79553°E	21300000014977

== Eslöv Municipality ==
Image	Name	Premises	Number of buildings	Year built	Architect	Coordinates	ID
	Båla Water Mill	Bålamöllan 1:3	3	1600s		55.94244°N 13.38059°E	21300000014959
	Eslöv Civic Center	Kopparslagaren 1	1	1958		55.83462°N 13.30280°E	21300000014393
	Eslöv station	Eslöv 54:1, 54:3	7	1865		55.83774°N 13.30517°E	21400000700917
	Harlösa Retirement Home	Harlösa 1:13 previously 1:4	1	1824		55.72390°N 13.52794°E	21300000014438
	Skarhult Castle	Skarhult 13:36 previously 13:30	4	Early 1500s		55.80411°N 13.37257°E	21300000014919
	Trollenäs Castle	Trollenäs 2:20	2	Early 1500s		55.86556°N 13.24506°E	21300000014929
	Västra Sallerup rectory	Jep Klockare 7 previously 4, 5	2	1868		55.82973°N 13.27609°E	21300000014979

== Helsingborg Municipality ==
Image	Name	Premises	Number of buildings	Year built	Architect	Coordinates	ID
	Essen Villa	Villan 1	1	1848	Gustav Friedrich Hetsch	56.04371°N 12.70153°E	21300000014453
	Gamlegård	Magnus Stenbock 20	2	1700s		56.047778°N 12.694694°E	21300000014463
	Helsingborg City Hall	Rådhuset 3 previously Rådhuset 2	1	1897	Alfred Hellerström	56.04670°N 12.69295°E	21300000014480
	Helsingborg Concert Hall	Rudolf Tornérhjelm 1	1	1932	Sven Markelius	56.04958°N 12.68887°E	21300000014455
	Helsingborg Lighthouse and Pilot House	Hamnpaviljongen 5	1	1889	John Höijer	56.04325°N 12.688°E	21320000040694
	Hjälmshult Royal Estate	Hjälmshult 1:2	10	1743		56.12732°N 12.68896°E	21300000015053
	Jacob Hansen House	Sockerbruket 2	3	1642		56.04848°N 12.69333°E	21300000014471
	Jöns Jonsgården	Signestorp 5:21	7	1805–1878		56.13759°N 12.77978°E	21300000014517
	Kulla Gunnarstorp Windmill	Kulla Gunnarstorp 1:21	2	1798		56.10363°N 12.63797°E	21300000014313
	Kärnan	Gamla Staden 8:2	1	1313–1320		56.04828°N 12.69750°E	21300000014472
	Kärnan Pharmacy	Kärnan Södra 8	1	1813		56.04661°N 12.69733°E	21300000014450
	Mörarp Filling Station	Byttan 13		1937	Texaco	56.05611°N 12.88028°E	21320000040690
	Old City Museum	Minerva 19	3	1845	Carl Georg Brunius	56.04526°N 12.69959°E	21300000014482
	Ramlösa hälsobrunn	Ramlösa 2:1	13	Early 1800s		56.02208°N 12.74678°E	21300000014475
	Rosendal Castle	Rosendal 2:1	20	16th century		56.08962°N 12.83087°E	21300000018013
	Tornérhjelm House	Kullen Östra 37	1	1804		56.04988°N 12.69233°E	21300000014486
	Vikingsberg	Vikingsberg 1 previously Gamla Staden 6:11	1	1870s	Mauritz Frohm	56.05222°N 12.69078°E	21300000014488

== Hässleholm Municipality ==
Image	Name	Premises	Number of buildings	Year built	Architect	Coordinates	ID
	Gundrastorp-Ekholmen Mill	Ekholmen 1:31	2	1870s		56.35451°N 13.70119°E	21300000014965
	Hovdala Castle	Hovdala 1:3 previously 1:2	9	1511		56.10402°N 13.71354°E	21300000015051
	Norra Mellby School and House for the Poor	Norra Mellby 2:2	2	1816		56.04838°N 13.72016°E	21300000023791

== Höganäs Municipality ==
Image	Name	Premises	Number of buildings	Year built	Architect	Coordinates	ID
	Fjälastorp Primary School	Fjälastorp 9:8	2	1880		56.25708°N 12.60445°E	21000001647301
	Gunnestorp Windmill	Ornakärr 2:21	none	1870		56.19169°N 12.67437°E	21300000014972
	Himmelstorp	Krapperup 19:1	4	1790s		56.28034°N 12.54347°E	21300000014350
	Hustoftagården	Hustofta 3:6	6	1884		56.19157°N 12.60706°E	21300000016010
	Krapperup Castle	Krapperup 19:1	10	1570s		56.26198°N 12.53135°E	21300000014354
	Paul Jönska estate	Loggen 1 previously Viken 10:2-3	2	1878		56.14424°N 12.57295°E	21300000014966
	Ulla Molin Garden	Spättan 1	2	1978		56.19424°N 12.55856°E	21000001647384
	Villa Italienborg	Mölle 12:67	1	1910		56.28721°N 12.49042°E	21300000014326

== Höör Municipality ==
Image	Name	Premises	Number of buildings	Year built	Architect	Coordinates	ID
	Bosjökloster	part of Bosjökloster 1:593, 1:740	11	1100s, with several later renovations		55.87726°N 13.51956°E	21300000014342

== Klippan Municipality ==
Image	Name	Premises	Number of buildings	Year built	Architect	Coordinates	ID
	F5	Bonnarp 43:4; Sjöleden 1:5	40	1872		56.07446°N 13.22688°E	21300000015139
	Herrevad Abbey	Herrevadskloster 2:66 previously Herrevadskloster 2:1	12	1100s		56.08836°N 13.23391°E	21300000014893

== Kristianstad Municipality ==
Image	Name	Premises	Number of buildings	Year built	Architect	Coordinates	ID
	Blåherremölla Watermill	Blåherremölla 1:2	5	1700s		55.76340°N 14.15629°E	21320000019178
	Bäckaskog Castle	Bäckaskog 1:17	7	1220s		56.08597°N 14.34682°E	21300000014524
	Cedergren estate	Gladan 18 previously Gladan 5 Stadsägan 157	2	1775		55.92179°N 14.29241°E	21300000014546
	Ekestad People's Park	Flackarp 1:9	1	1929		56.13003°N 14.25715°E	21300000016685
	Everöd rectory	Everöd 5:54	4	1803		55.90066°N 14.07204°E	21300000014398
	Folkestorp distillery	Folkestorp 6:5	1	1909		55.78824°N 14.14917°E	21300000018674
	Hovby Forge	Hovby 50:52	2	1850s		55.96368°N 14.19004°E	21320000018999
	Kristianstad Residence	Residenset 1	1	1860	Fredrik Wilhelm Scholander	56.02741°N 14.15632°E	21300000014548
	Kristianstad Station	Kristianstad 4:1, 5:59	3	1865		56.03384°N 14.14876°E	21300000014563
	Köpinge Ryttmästare's Home	Köpinge 101:1, 36:3, 23:3	6	1754		55.93889°N 14.16301°E	21300000014591
	Lillö Royal Estate	Lillö 50:2	6	1796		56.03415°N 14.11860°E	21300000014885
	Norra barracks, Norreport, guard house	Bastionen 6 previously Stg 566	2	1760s		56.03389°N 14.15291°E	21300000014552
	Oretorp Hunting Villa	Oretorp 6:1 previously Sönnarslöv 79:2	1	1871		55.90518°N 14.00538°E	21300000015041
	Perstorp Chapel	Oppmanna 4:16	3	1860		56.18165°N 14.31803°E	21300000014887
	Posthuset, previously Riksbanken, Kristianstad	Tyggården 2 previously Tyggården 1, 3	2	1917		56.03175°N 14.15565°E	21300000015062
	Skarsnäs forest farm	Skärsnäs 9:37	6	1818		56.25557°N 14.40721°E	21300000014971
	Southern barracks, Kristianstad	Södra Kasern 2 previously Södra Kasern 1	5	1770s		56.02762°N 14.15899°E	21300000014557
	Stora kronohuset	Hovrätten 20 previously Hovrätten 22	1	1841		56.03188°N 14.15411°E	21300000014542
	Old cottage in Tivoli Park	Kristianstad 4:21 previously Tivoliparken littera gk	1	1886		56.02890°N 14.15329°E	21300000014544
	Tobaksmonopolets facility in Fjälkinge	Fjälkinge 206:1		1918, 1930s, 1945, 1970s		56.04528°N 14.27408°E	21320000019001
	Torsebro gunpowder facility	Biskopsmöllan 1:1, 2:1	30	1683		56.10794°N 14.12783°E	21300000014407
	Tyghuset, Kristianstad	Tyggården 2	1	1617		56.03212°N 14.15624°E	21300000014567
	Vittskövle Castle	Vittskövle 95:1	1	1565		55.85479°N 14.13372°E	21300000014968
	von Berg estate	Bagaren 8	2	1794		55.92216°N 14.29464°E	21300000015036
	Österberg estate	David Nyborg 14	1	Early 1800s		56.03340°N 14.15502°E	21300000014569
	Österslöv old rectory	Österslöv 25:1	none	1600s		56.10195°N 14.24955°E	21300000015039

== Kävlinge Municipality ==
Image	Name	Premises	Number of buildings	Year built	Architect	Coordinates	ID
	Gamlegård Dagstorp	Dagstorp 5:2	4	1796		55.82355°N 13.06513°E	21300000014382

== Landskrona Municipality ==
Image	Name	Premises	Number of buildings	Year built	Architect	Coordinates	ID
	Fortification house, Landskrona	Gamla Bryggan 4	1	1757		55.86962°N 12.82485°E	21300000014595
	Gråen	Lundåkra 10:2	none	Early 1800s		55.8626°N 12.8157°E	21300000015153
	Häljarp windmill	Häljarp 2:5	1	1784		55.86193°N 12.90873°E	21300000014928
	Landskrona Citadel	Citadellstaden 2:1	18	1559		55.87227°N 12.82248°E	21300000015147
	Nämndemansgården	Tuna 11:1	8	1790s		55.89624°N 12.70990°E	21300000014900
	Old barracks, Landskrona	Gamla Kasern 1 Tyghuset 1 Citadellstaden 1:1	1	1760		55.87071°N 12.82871°E	21300000014613
	Tranchell House	Gamla Bryggan 19	2	1894		55.86939°N 12.82495°E	21300000014597
	Uraniborg	Uranienborg 1:1	3	1900		55.90515°N 12.69705°E	21300000015159

== Lomma Municipality ==
Image	Name	Premises	Number of buildings	Year built	Architect	Coordinates	ID
	Alnarp Castle	Alnarp 1:60	7	1862		55.65723°N 13.08357°E	21300000014623
	Borgeby Castle	Borgeby 23:6	7	1400s		55.75123°N 13.03707°E	21300000014337

== Lund Municipality ==
Image	Name	Premises	Number of buildings	Year built	Architect	Coordinates	ID
	Bergman House	Glädjen 15 previously glädjen 2-3	3	1744		55.70613°N 13.19213°E	21300000015186
	Bredgatan 19 and 21	S:t Peter 39	2	1790 and 1794		55.70849°N 13.19258°E	21300000014693
	Brunius House	Brunius 12	4	1840		55.70238°N 13.19722°E	21300000014635
	Dalby royal estate	Dalby 60:1	5	1400		55.66454°N 13.34371°E	21300000015136
	Ek House	S:t Peter 28	1	1827		55.70642°N 13.19148°E	21300000014642
	Flyinge royal estate	Flyinge 22:40	12	1818		55.74836°N 13.35171°E	21300000014923
	Historical Museum, Lund	Historiska Museet 1	1	1845		55.70432°N 13.19505°E	21300000014658
	Hyphoff Quarter	Hyphoff 5	4	1886–1897		55.70685°N 13.19962°E	21300000014685
	Johan Henrik Thomander's student home	Thomander 1	2	1855		55.70717°N 13.19690°E	21300000015088
	Kanik Residence	Maria Magle 11	1	1220s		55.70291°N 13.19690°E	21300000014662
	Katedralskolan, Lund	Katedralskolan 8 previously Katedralskolan 1	2	Mid-1500s		55.69992°N 13.19089°E	21300000014665
	Kjederquist estate	S:t Peter 32	4	1812		55.70822°N 13.19201°E	21300000014667
	Krognos House	Döbeln 8	1	1300s		55.70226°N 13.19529°E	21300000014672
	Liljewalch House	Glädjen 4	6	Late 1700s		55.70593°N 13.19220°E	21300000014686
	Lund Botanical Garden	Botanicum 15	5	1867		55.70457°N 13.20239°E	21300000014626
	Lund City Hall	S:t Botulf 14	1	1836		55.70274°N 13.19359°E	21300000014689
	Lund Observatory	Svanelyckan 3	6	1867		55.69975°N 13.18773°E	21300000015080
	Lund University Library	Absalon 5 previously kv Bispen	1	1907		55.70905°N 13.19731°E	21300000014730
	Lund University Main Building	Universitetet 1 previously Universitetet 2	1	1882		55.70585°N 13.19333°E	21300000015126
	Miss Görvel's House	Färgaren 27	1	1570		55.70114°N 13.19208°E	21300000014645
	Old library	Universitetet 1 previously Innerstaden 4:14	1	1584		55.70527°N 13.19394°E	21300000014679
	Palaestra et Odeum	Universitetet 1 previously Universitetet 2	1	1882		55.70604°N 13.19478°E	21300000015124
	Railway guard's cottage in Håstad	Håstad 23:1	2	1857		55.77345°N 13.22650°E	21300000014514
	Revingehed	Revinge 1:12	16	1887		55.71573°N 13.49771°E	21300000015120
	Scania Mortgage Association	Altona 2	2	1918		55.70473°N 13.19198°E	21300000014697
	Stäket	Färgaren 26	1	1570s		55.70155°N 13.19221°E	21300000014710
	Tegnér Museum	Gråbröder 15	1	1768		55.70424°N 13.19114°E	21300000014631
	Theologicum, Lund (now Archaeologicum)	Universitetet 1 previously Universitetet 2	1	1853		55.70597°N 13.19537°E	21300000015123
	Westman villa	Professorn 10	1	1939		55.70522°N 13.20609°E	21300000014744
	Wickman estate	Paradis 35	5	1788		55.70629°N 13.19318°E	21300000014732
	Zettervall villa	Thomander 32	1	1871		55.70692°N 13.19695°E	21300000014735
	Östervång School	Dövstumskolan 11	1	1871		55.70180°N 13.20471°E	21300000014740

== Malmö Municipality ==
Image	Name	Premises	Number of buildings	Year built	Architect	Coordinates	ID
	Castle windmill	Innerstaden 10:14	2	1851		55.60304°N 12.98620°E	21300000014867
	Central Post Office Building (Malmö)	Aegir 1	1	1906		55.61003°N 12.99886°E	21300000014769
	Commandant's House	Innerstaden 10:14	2	1794		55.60543°N 12.98483°E	21300000014810
	Company house, Malmö	Claus Mortensen 40	1	1529		55.60599°N 13.00205°E	21300000014815
	County governor's residence, Malmö	Residenset 1, 5	2	1730		55.60702°N 13.00097°E	21300000014858
	Diskusmacken	Tomtebo 13		1954		55.59444°N 12.98306°E	21320000030114
	Djäknegatan 3–5	von Conow 47	4	1817, 1848		55.60607°N 13.00427°E	21300000014824
	Djäknegatan 7	von Conow 38	1	1794		55.60590°N 13.00427°E	21300000014835
	Djäknegatan 9	von Conow 37	3	1800s		55.60574°N 13.00417°E	21300000014834
	Djäknegatan 11	von Conow 36	2	1857		55.60566°N 13.00426°E	21300000014831
	Djäknegatan 15	von Conow 34	2	1882		55.60557°N 13.00420°E	21300000014828
	Djäknegatan 17	von Conow 33	1	1898		55.60545°N 13.00431°E	21300000014825
	Flensburg House	Oscar 21, 22	none	1596		55.6047°N 13.0010°E	21300000014772
	Hedman estate	Gyllenstjärna 7	5	1596		55.60465°N 12.99911°E	21300000014789
	Hippodrome, Malmö	von Conow 42, 46		1899		55.60556°N 13.00358°E	21300000014794
	Jörgen Kock House	Frans Suell 13	5	1524		55.60676°N 12.99879°E	21300000014802
	Malmö Castle	Innerstaden 10:284	1	1434		55.60487°N 12.98746°E	21300000014859
	Malmö Central Station	Innerstaden 31:10	1	1872		55.60889°N 12.99965°E	21300000014758
	Malmö Opera, musical theater	Teatern 4	1	1944		55.59602°N 12.99618°E	21300000014874
	National Bank Building	Diskonten 3	1	1888		55.60727°N 13.00275°E	21300000014776
	Old Court of Appeals, Malmö	Bastionen Nyköping 1	1	1917		55.60581°N 12.99130°E	21300000014775
	Ribersborgs open-air bath	Limhamn 10:3, 11:276	1	1867		55.60516°N 12.96566°E	21300000014850
	Rosenving and Beijer houses	Jörgen Kock 3	4	1534, 1873		55.60694°N 12.99791°E	21300000014854
	Sjöberg Palace	Humle 21, 22, 29	6	1893		55.60735°N 13.00886°E	21300000014864

== Osby Municipality ==
Image	Name	Premises	Number of buildings	Year built	Architect	Coordinates	ID
	Wood chip basket factory in Lönsboda	Lönsboda 1:84	1	1918		56.40021°N 14.32063°E	21000001588380
	Wool spinning mill in Strömsborg	Dubbarp 1:41	1	1837		56.34841°N 14.01229°E	21300000014889

== Simrishamn Municipality ==
Image	Name	Premises	Number of buildings	Year built	Architect	Coordinates	ID
	Bergengren estate	Kocken 23	none	1818		55.5561°N 14.3500°E	21300000014902
	Fischer estate	Kocken 29	1	1844		55.55590°N 14.34960°E	21300000014905
	Gyllebo Manor	Gyllebo 1:30	1	1818		55.59901°N 14.19630°E	21300000015043
	Hafreborg	Lars Johan 12	1	1848		55.55652°N 14.34773°E	21300000015197
	Hammenhög Courthouse	Hammenhög 44:23	1	1885		55.50004°N 14.14225°E	21300000014429
	Store in Ålen Quarter	Ålen 2	1	1749		55.55769°N 14.35221°E	21300000014906
	Sträntemölla	Sträntemölla 1:2	6	1749		55.61874°N 14.23969°E	21300000015166
	Tjörnedala Farm	Tjörnedala 1:7 previously 1:3	none	1800		55.5981°N 14.3029°E	21300000014408

== Sjöbo Municipality ==
Image	Name	Premises	Number of buildings	Year built	Architect	Coordinates	ID
	Kumlatofta	Kumlatofta 5:12	4	1800s		55.60820°N 13.61865°E	21300000015182
	Sövdeborg Castle	Sövdeborg 1:1	5	1597		55.58084°N 13.69680°E	21300000014949
	Övedskloster Manor	Övedskloster 2:10, 2:23, 2:95	18	1776		55.69202°N 13.64267°E	21300000015046

== Skurup Municipality ==
Image	Name	Premises	Number of buildings	Year built	Architect	Coordinates	ID
	Svaneholm Castle	Svaneholm 2:1	1	1530		55.50084°N 13.47809°E	21300000014921

== Svalöv Municipality ==
Image	Name	Premises	Number of buildings	Year built	Architect	Coordinates	ID
	Villa Pettersson	Södra Svalöv 9:87	2	1937		55.91209°N 13.10882°E	21300000016426
	Källs-Nöbbelövs prästgård	Källs Nöbbelöv 2:17	2	1806		55.88672°N 13.07624°E	21300000014577

== Svedala Municipality ==
Image	Name	Premises	Number of buildings	Year built	Architect	Coordinates	ID
	Skabersjöskolan	Skabersjö 25:2	1	1942	S. Johnsson	55.54784°N 13.16054°E	21300000014909

== Tomelilla Municipality ==
Image	Name	Premises	Number of buildings	Year built	Architect	Coordinates	ID
	Agusastugan	Agusa 1:49	1	1800s		55.76473°N 14.00021°E	21300000014319
	Bollerup Castle	Bollerups säteri 3:5	1	1300s		55.49148°N 14.04553°E	21300000014334
	Bondrumsgården	Bondrum 13:19	4	1767		55.65645°N 14.03151°E	21300000014406
	Glimmebodagården	Bertilstorp 19:2 previously Glimmeboda 3:1	5	1700s		55.74364°N 14.08698°E	21300000015054
	Skvaltkvarnen i Sillarödsbäcken	Sillaröd 1:38		1832		55.70890°N 13.91634°E	21320000040325
	Södra Björstorps gård	Södra Björstorp 1:1	3	1775		55.70743°N 14.08697°E	21300000014367
	Tomelilla byagård	Byagården 1 previously stadsäga 503	4	Early 1800s		55.54077°N 13.94524°E	21300000014938
	Tunbyholm Castle	Tunbyholm 1:40	3	Early 1600s		55.59764°N 14.12346°E	21300000014940
	Övraby väderkvarn	Övraby 7:2	2	1887		55.49932°N 13.94690°E	21300000015038

== Trelleborg Municipality ==
Image	Name	Premises	Number of buildings	Year built	Architect	Coordinates	ID
	Jordberga Castle	Stora Jordberga 1:6; del av	8	1650s		55.41568°N 13.41498°E	21300000014585
	Klörups häradshäkte	Klörup 3:3	1	1809		55.45565°N 13.17747°E	21300000014621
	Skegrie mölla	Skegrie 14:5, 14:11	3	1895		55.41074°N 13.06058°E	21300000015995
	Trelleborg Old City Hall	Herkules 31	1	1867		55.37355°N 13.15808°E	21300000026917
	Trelleborg Barracks Lighthouse	Innerstaden 6:1	none	1930, 1897 (lighthouse)		55.3568°N 13.1492°E	21300000015176

== Vellinge Municipality ==
Image	Name	Premises	Number of buildings	Year built	Architect	Coordinates	ID
	Andreas Lundbergagården	Falsterbo 26:1	3	1700s		55.39270°N 12.83700°E	21300000014403
	Bröddarps mölla	Bröddarp 7:30	1	1840		55.49892°N 13.10974°E	21300000014975
	Falsterbo Lighthouse	Falsterbo 2:6	4	1795		55.38382°N 12.81670°E	21300000014404
	Håslövs stubbamölla	Södra Håslöv 18:2 previously 18:1	1	1758		55.43750°N 13.03395°E	21300000014491
	Skanörs mölla	Skanör 22:2 previously Möllehejdan 2	1	1698		55.41411°N 12.84257°E	21300000014912
	Skanörs rådhus	Skanör 36:1	1	1777		55.41862°N 12.84910°E	21300000014913

== Ystad Municipality ==
Image	Name	Premises	Number of buildings	Year built	Architect	Coordinates	ID
	Gamla rådhuset, Ystad	Gamla Staden 2:3	1	1500s		55.42944°N 13.81963°E	21300000014991
	Apotektshusen, Ystad	Waldemar 6 previously Valdemar 4	3	1500s		55.43006°N 13.82018°E	21300000014982
	Bjärsjöholm Castle	Bergsjöholm 1:1	2	1500s		55.45348°N 13.77758°E	21300000014321
	Brahehuset	Brigitta 35	1	ca. 1500		55.43087°N 13.81803°E	21300000014988
	Greyfriars Abbey	Yngve Norra 6	2	ca. 1400		55.43110°N 13.81982°E	21300000014993
	Hans Raffns gård	Lovisa 18	none	1570		55.4306°N 13.8176°E	21300000015022
	Fängelset Hvita Briggen	Hvita Briggen 1 previously Lichton 2	2	1878		55.42681°N 13.80718°E	21300000014990
	Latinskolan, Ystad	Disa 4	1	1500		55.42905°N 13.81845°E	21300000015023
	Per Hälsas gård	Birger Västra 1	1	1700s		55.43039°N 13.82724°E	21300000015024
	Pilgrändshuset	Lars 8	2	1520s		55.43021°N 13.82405°E	21300000015026
	Ruuthsbo	Ruuthsbo 2:1	3	1800s		55.44570°N 13.73408°E	21300000014330
	Sandhammaren Lighthouse	Hagestad 3:3, 6:6, 27:6, 31:10	1	1863		55.38670°N 14.19295°E	21300000015212
	Svenstorps mölla	Svenstorp 9:1	2	1853		55.48088°N 13.93962°E	21300000018685
	Ystad Courthouse	Ystad 1	1	1903		55.42825°N 13.82702°E	21300000015029
	Ystad railway station	Edvinshem 2:61	1	1865		55.42709°N 13.82501°E	21300000015030
	Ystad Theater	Teatern 1	1	1894		55.42771°N 13.81831°E	21300000015027
	Ystad Inner (Upper) Lighthouse	Edvinshem 2:2	1	1866		55.42701°N 13.82566°E	21300000015180
	Örum House	Örum 19:7	2	First half of the 1800s		55.45729°N 14.09328°E	21300000015060

== Ängelholm Municipality ==
Image	Name	Premises	Number of buildings	Year built	Architect	Coordinates	ID
	Ausås rectory	Ausås 15:1	3	1770		56.16626°N 12.88523°E	21300000014320
	Össjö herrgård	Össjö 31:13	8	1815		56.23234°N 13.02556°E	21300000015216

== Åstorp Municipality ==
Image	Name	Premises	Number of buildings	Year built	Architect	Coordinates	ID
	Tomarps Kungsgård Castle	Tommarp 1:1	1	Mid-1400s		56.14923°N 13.06109°E	21300000014573

== Örkelljunga Municipality ==
Image	Name	Premises	Number of buildings	Year built	Architect	Coordinates	ID
	Ingeborrarpsgården	Ingeborrarp 1:4	4	1700s		56.22475°N 13.17671°E	21300000014897

== Östra Göinge Municipality ==
Image	Name	Premises	Number of buildings	Year built	Architect	Coordinates	ID
	Ballingstorp	Ballingstorp 1:9	5	1700s		56.12868°N 14.13115°E	21300000014534
	Sporrakulla gård	Sporrakulla 1:1	5	1700s		56.28786°N 14.24179°E	21300000014410
	Vanås Castle	Vanås 3:12	8	1400s		56.18676°N 14.04639°E	21300000014422
