= Frumkin =

Frumkin (Russian: Фру́мкин, Ukrainian: Фру́мкін, Hebrew: פְרוּמְקִין), feminine: Frumkina is an East Ashkenazi Jewish matronymic surname derived from the female given name Frumka, a diminitive of Fruma. Notable people with the surname include:

== Frumkin ==
- Abraham Frumkin (1872–1946), Jewish anarchist
- Alexander Naumovich Frumkin (1895–1976), Russian electrochemist
- Amos Frumkin (born 1953), Israeli geologist
- Aryeh Leib Frumkin (1845–1916), rabbi and a founder of Petah Tikvah
- Gad Frumkin (1887–1960), Israeli jurist, judge on the Supreme Court of Mandatory Palestine
- Gene Frumkin (1928–2007), American poet and teacher
- Harold Frumkin (Frumpkin)
- Heshel Shlomo Frumkin (1896–1974), Israeli economist and politician
- Israel Dov Frumkin (1850–1914), Jewish journalist in Palestine
- Michael Levi Frumkin (1845–1904), Jewish-American publisher
- Peter Frumkin (fl. from 2002), professor and author
- Sidney Frumkin (1903–1976)
- Si Frumkin (Lithuanian: Simas Frumkinas; 1930–2009), Jewish Lithuanian-American activist
- Sylvia Frumkin, pseudonym of the subject of Susan Sheehan's 1982 biography Is There No Place On Earth For Me?

== Froomkin ==
- Dan Froomkin (fl. from 1985), American journalist
- Michael Froomkin (born 1960), American legal academic
- Saul Froomkin, Attorney General of Bermuda, 1981–1991

== Fromkin ==
- David Fromkin (1932–2017), lawyer, historian, and author
- Victoria Fromkin (1923–2000), American linguist

== See also ==
- Frumin
- Frumkes, West/Central Ashkenazi surname of the same derivation
- Frum
- Fromm (disambiguation)
