= Bob Nicholson (sports executive) =

Bob Nicholson (born 1955) is a sport executive who was president of the Toronto Argonauts and an executive of the Montreal Expos when they moved to Washington D.C. to become the Washington Nationals.

== Biography ==
He grew up in Willowdale, Ontario and was educated at the University of Toronto. In 1974, he worked for Coopers & Lybrand Chartered Accountants and became a chartered accountant. From 1982 to 1994 he was a director at the Toronto Blue Jays.

=== First stint at the Toronto Argonauts ===
In 1993, the Blue Jays bought the Toronto Argonauts, a year later, in December 1994, Nicholson then became the president of the Argonauts and remained at the post until 1999, when the team was bought by Sherwood Schwarz. During his time at the Argonauts they won consecutive Grey Cups in 1996 and 1997. He was succeeded as team president by Sherwood Schwarz who then appointed Michael 'Pinball' Clemons to the position in 2002.

After two years working for Neil Jamieson, the owner of the Toronto ThunderHawks, he became Chief financial officer of the Montreal Expos. He was in charge in 2004, when they moved from Montreal to Washington and were renamed the Washington Nationals to start the 2005 Major League Baseball season. It was first time a Major League Baseball team had relocated since 1972.

=== Second stint at the Toronto Argonauts ===
In 2007, he left the Nationals and founded Wizard Sports Groups and was a member of the Canadian Olympic Committee. In May 2009, he returned as team president of the Toronto Argonauts. On 5 November 2003, Howard Sokolowski and David Cynamon bought the team with assistance from David Braley, so when Braley bought the team from Sokolowski and Cynamon on 9 February 2010, Nicholson remained as president.

In 2011, he resigned as president of the Argonauts and returned to Wizard Sports Group and was succeeded by Chris Rudge.

== See also ==
- Toronto Argonauts
