= Frumin =

Frumin (Russian: Фрумин, Hebrew: פרומין), feminine: Frumina is an East Ashkenazi Jewish matronymic surname derived from the female given name Fruma. Notable people with the surname include:

- Alan Frumin (born 1946), American lawyer and political advisor
- Boris Frumin, Latvian film director
- Dina Frumina (1914-2005), Soviet and Ukrainian artist, teacher.
- Matthew Frumin, American politician

== See also ==
- Frumkes, West/Central Ashkenazi surname of the same derivation
- Frumkin
- Froumine, French-language trascription
