= Frome Dam =

Dam and former power station in Tasmania, Australia

- Location of the former power station in Tasmania
- Interactive map of Frome Dam
- Country: Australia
- Location: North East Tasmania
- Coordinates: 41°08′40″S 147°54′42″E
- Purpose: Power; Irrigation; Potable water supply
- Status: Operational
- Construction began: 1908
- Opening date: 1909
- Owners: Pioneer Tin Mining Co. (1908–1988); Moorina Hydro Pty Ltd (1988–2009); Tasmanian Irrigation (since 2009– )

Dam and spillways
- Type of dam: Rock-fill dam
- Impounds: Frome River
- Height: 18 m (59 ft)
- Length: 197 m (646 ft)
- Dam volume: 25×10^{3} m^{3} (880×10^{3} cu ft)
- Spillway type: Uncontrolled
- Spillway capacity: 80 m^{3}/s (2,800 cu ft/s)

Reservoir
- Total capacity: 1,820 ML (1,480 acre⋅ft)
- Catchment area: 17 km^{2} (6.6 sq mi)
- Surface area: 90 ha (220 acres)
- Normal elevation: 331 m (1,086 ft) AHD

Moorina Power Station
- Coordinates: 41°45′07″S 147°32′38″E
- Commission date: 1909
- Decommission date: 2008
- Type: Conventional
- Hydraulic head: 129 m (423 ft)
- Turbines: 3x 325 kW (436 hp) (Voight-type)
- Installed capacity: 975 kW (1,307 hp)
- Annual generation: 4 GWh (14 TJ)

Tasmanian Heritage Register
- Official name: Moorina Hydro-electricity Power Development
- Reference no.: 1396

The Frome Dam is a concrete-faced rockfill embankment dam across the Frome River, located near the hamlet of Moorina in far north-eastern Tasmania, Australia. Completed in 1908, the resultant reservoir was established for the purpose of generating hydro-electric power via the Moorina Power Station, a subsequently decommissioned conventional hydroelectric power station. At the time of its closure in 2008, Moorina Power Station was the oldest operating electricity generator in Australia.

The former power station and associated equipment are listed on the Tasmanian Heritage Register.

== Dam and reservoir overview ==
The concrete-faced rockfill dam was the first of its kind in Australia. It was built in 1908 to supply water for a power station for the Pioneer Tin Mining Co. (Note: Also stated as the Endurance Tin Mining Company and as Brisies Tin Mine at Derby, at the time, the largest tin mine in the northeast.) In addition, the dam supplied the village of Pioneer with potable water, was also used for mining operations, and, since 2009, has assisted with irrigation downriver of the dam.

The dam wall is 18 metres (59 ft) high and 197 metres (646 ft) long, following alterations carried out in 1911. When full, the small reservoir has capacity of 1,820 megalitres (1,480 acre⋅ft) and covers 90 hectares (220 acres), drawn from a catchment area of 17 square kilometres (6.6 sq mi). The uncontrolled spillway has a flow capacity of 80 cubic metres per second (2,800 cu ft/s).

Since its establishment, ownership of the dam and its associated assets have included the Pioneer Tin Mining Co. (1908–1988), Moorina Hydro Pty Ltd (1988–2009), and, since 2009, Tasmanian Irrigation Pty. Ltd. In 2011, it was reported that Tasmanian Irrigation were constructing a 10-kilometre (6.2 mi) pipeline from the Frome Dam to the northern branch of the existing irrigation scheme near Winnaleah, to increase the supply of water from the scheme; that was operational by May 2025.

== Hydroelectric power station ==
=== Concept and construction ===
In 1900, the Pioneer Tin Mining Co. was formed to extract tin (cassiterite) from Tertiary alluvial deposits found in abundance in the far north-east of Tasmania, at the town of Pioneer. At the time the only dedicated power station in Tasmania was the Duck Reach Power Station, near Launceston, which was entirely devoted to street lighting and the general needs of the city of Launceston.

In addition, "Water shortages for sluicing and the consumption of 30,000 tonnes (30,000 long tons; 33,000 short tons) of firewood per annum for steam raising had, by 1907, led to the proposal to develop the Moorina Scheme to provide both electricity and sluicing water". Opened between 1906 and 1907, construction of the station proceeded during 1908 with and the first machine was commissioned in March 1909.

=== Technical details ===
The station is housed in a small 10-by-15-metre (33 by 49 ft) corrugated galvanised iron building, which at one point had several out-buildings nearby. Most of these buildings remain including two 1908 houses, a 1939 build engineer's residence, and a machine shed. There is limited public access to the area.

Water for operations is supplied from the Frome Dam, located 1.6 kilometres (0.99 mi) due south from the powerhouse. As well as generating power for the mine, the water was transported to Pioneer via a race to supply the town and the mine. A 2.7-kilometre-long (1.7 mi) race and penstock conveyed water to the power station itself, where is passed through the machinery inside. Other races collected runoff from the headwaters of the Wyniford and Weld rivers.

The plant possessed three (Note: Some sources describe the plant as having only one turbine.) generating sets, each rated at 325 kilowatts (436 hp) or 360 kVA, at 50 hertz (6,000,000 m) and 6.5 kV, with capacity of 975 kilowatts (1,307 hp) or 1,080 kVA. (Note: The Tasmanian Hydro-Electric Commission (HEC) stated that the plant produced only 600 kilowatts (800 hp). The Tasmanian Greens discussion paper, 'Power without Purpose - Tasmania's Energy Glut', stated similar capacity.) The decision to fit 50-hertz (6,000,000 m) alternators made integration with the main Tasmanian hydro-electric system much easier. The turbines were built by J.M. Voight, of Heidenheim, Germany, while the alternators were built by AEG. Prior to its closure, the plant was generating approximately 4 gigawatt-hours (14 TJ) annually.

=== Decommissioning ===
The Pioneer tin mine closed in the mid-1980s, and since then the plant has been owned and operated by Moorina Hydro Pty. Ltd., with a crew of two. In 2008 the power station was closed due to the high cost of upgrading equipment. Ownership of the dam was transferred to Tasmanian Irrigation.

== See also ==
- List of power stations in Tasmania
- List of dams and reservoirs in Tasmania
