= Fomm =

Fomm is a surname. Notable people with the surname include:

- Joana Fomm (born 1939), Brazilian actress
- Klara-Hermine Fomm (born 1999), German curler

== See also ==
- Fromm
