= Fruman =

Fruman is a surname. Notable people with the surname include:

- Igor Fruman (born 1966), Soviet-born American businessman
- Menachem Fruman (1945–2013), Israeli Orthodox rabbi
- Orly Fruman (born 1955), Israeli politician

== See also ==
- Froman
