= Murray Frum =

Canadian real estate developer

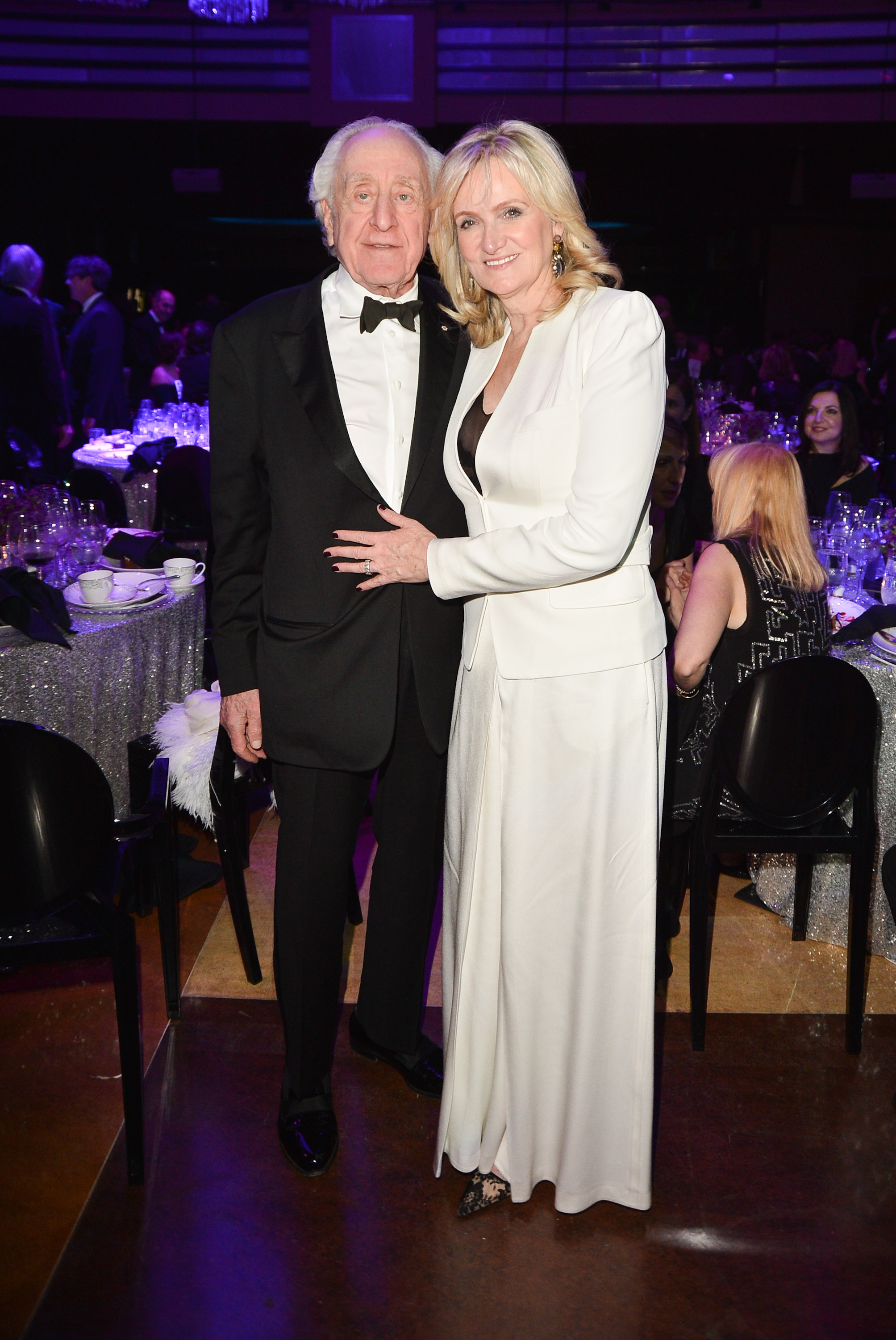
- Frum with his second wife, Nancy Lockhart, at the 2013 CFC Annual Gala & Auction
- Born: September 3, 1931; Toronto, Ontario, Canada
- Died: May 28, 2013 (aged 81); Toronto, Ontario, Canada
- Resting place: York Cemetery, Toronto
- Education: Harbord Collegiate Institute; University of Toronto
- Occupations: Dentist, real estate developer, philanthropist
- Spouses: Barbara Frum (m. 1957; died 1992); Nancy Lockhart (m. 1994)
- Children: 3, including David and Linda Frum
- Family: Howard Sokolowski (son-in-law)

Murray Frum (September 3, 1931 – May 28, 2013) was a Canadian real estate developer and philanthropist.

He was born to a Jewish family on September 3, 1931, the only child of Saul and Rivka Frum, who had emigrated from Poland the year before. Most of their family who stayed in Poland were murdered in the Holocaust. His parents operated a grocery store in Toronto. Frum attended King Edward Public School and in 1950, graduated from the Harbord Collegiate Institute. In 1956, he graduated with a degree in dentistry from the University of Toronto. In 1970 he left dentistry to become a real estate developer (the Frum Development Group) and made his fortune developing suburban strip malls.

Frum was a collector of African art and donated over 80 pieces to the Art Gallery of Ontario, one of the largest in North America; and along with his son-in-law, Howard Sokolowski, built the gallery in which the collection is housed. He later expanded into Renaissance art. In 2007, he donated Bernini's 17th-century bronze of the crucifixion to the Art Gallery of Ontario which he bought while its origin was uncertain (it was later appraised at $50 million). Frum served on the boards of the Stratford Festival, the Canadian Centre for Advanced Film Study, and the Art Gallery of Ontario.

== Personal life ==
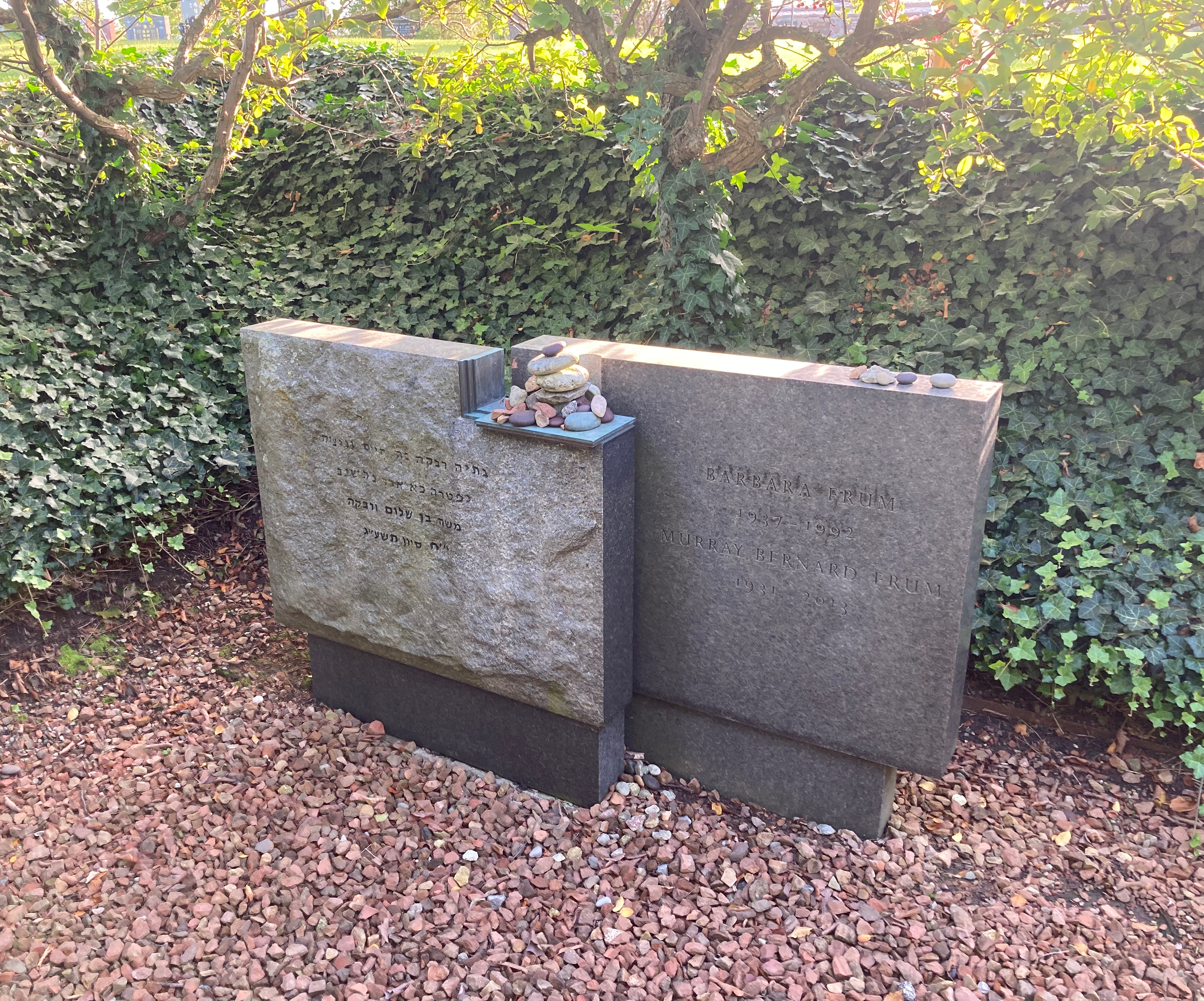
Graves of Murray and Barbara Frum at York Cemetery

Frum married twice. In 1957, he married 19-year-old Barbara Rosberg who would later become a CBC broadcaster; she died of leukemia in 1992. The couple had three children: David Frum, a journalist and a former speechwriter for U.S. president George W. Bush; Linda Frum, a Canadian senator who is married to Howard Sokolowski; and Matthew Frum.

His second marriage was to Nancy Lockhart. He died on May 28, 2013, at his home in Toronto of lung cancer despite being a non-smoker. He was buried with Barbara at York Cemetery.
