= Barbara Frum (TV program) =

Canadian talk show

- Genre: Talk show
- Directed by: Dino Marcuz; Bryn Matthews
- Presented by: Barbara Frum
- Country of origin: Canada
- Original language: English

Production
- Executive producer: William Harcourt
- Producers: Michael Burns; Larry Zolf

Original release
- Release: October 1974 – July 1975

Barbara Frum is a Canadian talk show that aired on CBC Television between October 1974 and July 1975. Barbara Frum interviewed various guests including Michael Magee, Charlotte Gobeil, Paul Rimstead, Allan Fotheringham, and Jack Webster and in the premiere episode her guests included Roman Gralewicz, the President of the Seafarers' International Union, and, for a surprise appearance, Gerda Munsinger, the woman at the centre of a 1966 scandal (the Munsinger Affair) that involved Cabinet Minister Pierre Sévigny.
