= Frome (disambiguation) =

Frome is a town in Somerset, England.

Frome may also refer to:

- Frome (surname)

== Relating to the Somerset town ==
- Frome railway station
- Frome Community College
- Frome Town F.C.
- Frome (UK Parliament constituency) (1832–1950)

== Other places ==
- Electoral district of Frome, a state electoral district in South Australia
- Frome St Quintin, village in west Dorset, England
- Frome Vauchurch, village in west Dorset, England
- Frome, Jamaica, small town
- Mount Frome, locality in Australia

== Rivers ==
Australia

- Frome River, in the Lake Eyre basin in South Australia

United Kingdom

- River Frome, Bristol
- River Frome, Dorset
- River Frome, Herefordshire
- River Frome, Somerset
- River Frome, Stroud

== Other ==
- Frome Road, a road in Adelaide, South Australia
- Frome Sports Club, multi-use stadium in Savanna-la-Mar, Jamaica
- Frome Street, a street in Adelaide, South Australia
- Lake Frome (disambiguation)
