= Lake Frome (disambiguation) =

Lake Frome may refer to the following:

- Lake Frome, a lake in South Australia.
- Lake Frome (south east), a lake in the locality of Southend, South Australia
- Lake Frome, South Australia, a locality.
- Lake Frome Conservation Park, a protected area in the locality of Southend, South Australia.
- Lake Frome National Park, a protected area in South Australia.

== See also ==
- Edward Charles Frome
- Frome (disambiguation)
