= Vrooman (surname) =

Vrooman is a surname. Notable people with the name include:

- Adam Edward Vrooman (1847–1923), Canadian doctor and politician
- Carl Schurz Vrooman (1872–1966), Assistant United States Secretary of Agriculture
- Daniel Vrooman (1818–1895), American missionary and cartographer
- John Perry Vrooman (1860–1923), Canadian doctor and politician
- John W. Vrooman (1844–1929), American lawyer, banker and politician
- Julia Scott Vrooman, (1876 –1981), American writer
- Peter H. Vrooman (born 1966), American diplomat
- Tamara Vrooman (born 1968), Canadian businesswoman

== See also ==
- Frahm, Frohm, From, Fromer, Fromm, Fromme, Frommel, Frommer/Frommert, Frum, Frumer, Vroom, Vroome, Vroomen
