= Alexandre Vinet =

Swiss literary critic and theologian (1797–1847)

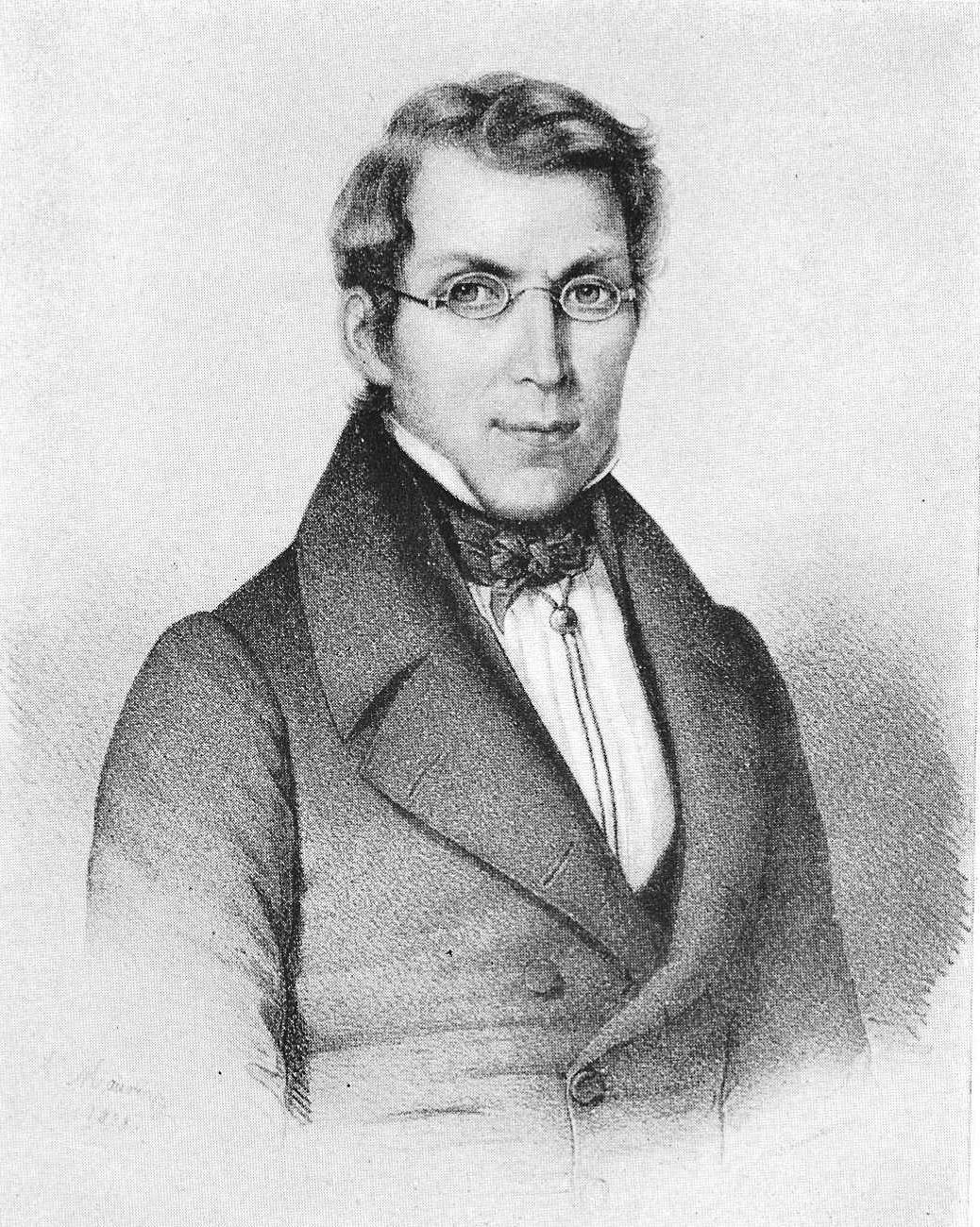
- Vinet in 1838

Personal life
- Born: 17 June 1797 near Lausanne, Switzerland
- Died: 4 May 1847 (aged 49) Clarens, Vaud

Religious life
- Religion: Protestant
- Profession: Teacher (French & literature); Literary critic
- Ordination: 1819

Alexandre Rodolphe Vinet (17 June 1797 – 4 May 1847) was a Swiss literary critic and theologian.

== Literary critic ==
He was born near Lausanne, Switzerland. Educated for the Protestant ministry, he was ordained in 1819, when already teacher of the French language and literature in the gymnasium at Basel; and throughout his life he was as much a critic as a theologian. His literary criticism brought him into contact with Charles Augustin Sainte-Beuve, for whom he obtained an invitation to lecture at Lausanne, which led to his famous work on Port-Royal.

Vinet's Chrestomathie française (1829), his Études sur la littérature française au XIX^{me} siècle (1840–1851), and his Histoire de la littérature française au XVIII^{me} siècle, together with his Études sur Pascal, Études sur les moralistes aux XVI^{me} et XVII^{me} siècles, Histoire de la prédication parmi les Réformés de France and other related works, gave evidence of a wide knowledge of literature, acute literary judgment and a distinguished faculty of appreciation. He adjusted his theories to the work under review, and condemned nothing as long as it met his literary standards.

== Theologian ==
As a theologian Vinet gave a fresh impulse to Protestant theology, especially in French-speaking lands, but also in England and elsewhere. Lord Acton classed him with Richard Rothe. His philosophy relied strongly on conscience, defined as that by which man stands in direct personal relation with God as moral sovereign, and the seat of a moral individuality which nothing can rightly infringe. He advocated complete freedom of religious belief, and to this end the formal separation of church and state in Mémoire en faveur de la liberté des cultes (1826), Essai sur la conscience (1829), Essai sur la manifestation des convictions religieuses (1842).

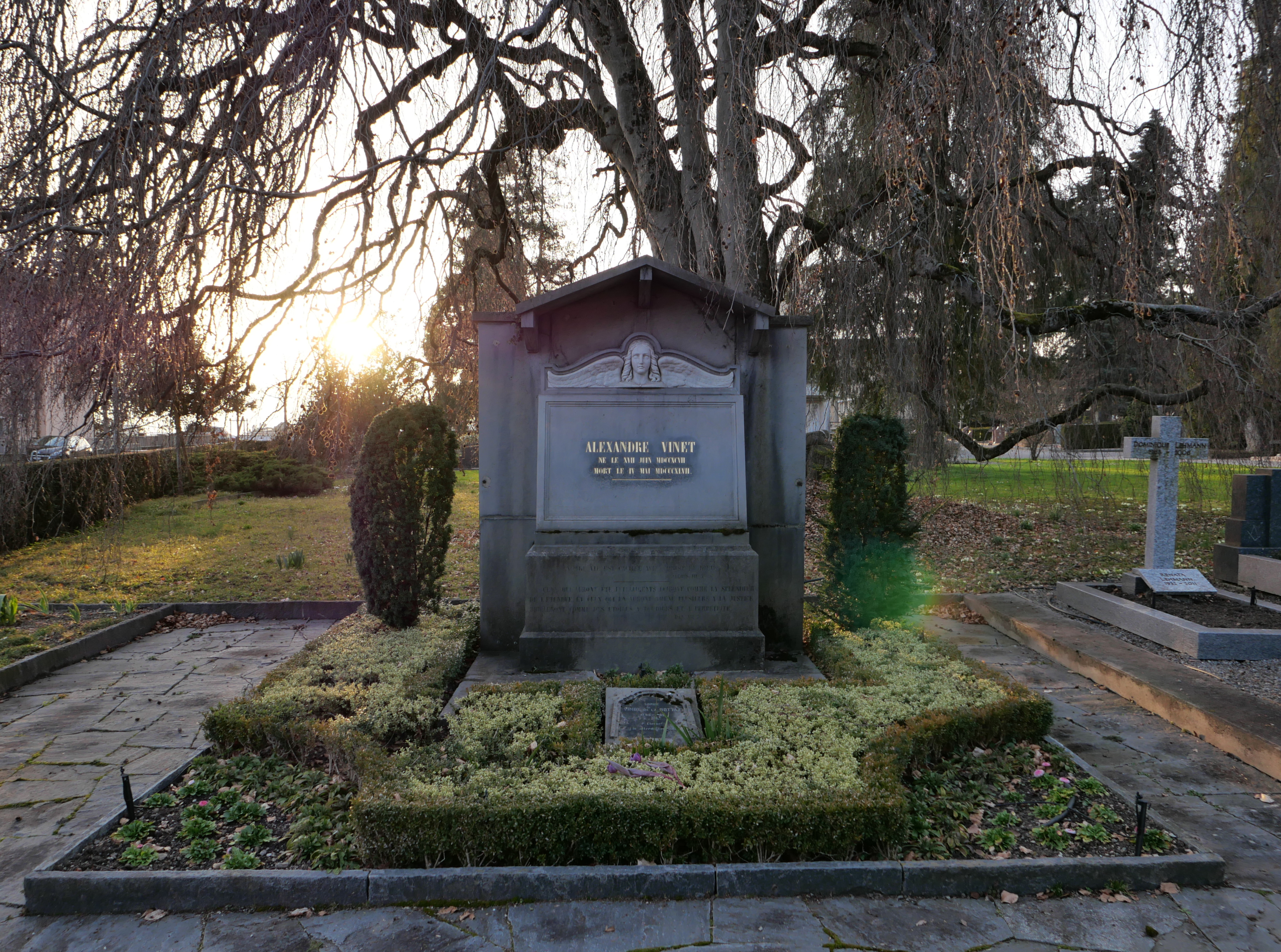
The grave of Vinet and his wife Sophie Germaine Auguste, née de la Rottaz (1796–1882), who was also his cousin, at the cemetery of Clarens. The couple had two children: Stéphanie and Auguste.

Accordingly, when in 1845 the civil power in the canton of Vaud interfered with the church's autonomy, he led a secession which took the name of L'Église libre. But already from 1831, when he published his Discours sur quelques sujets religieux (Nouveaux discours, 1841), he had begun to exert a liberalizing and deepening influence on religious thought far beyond his own canton, by bringing traditional doctrine to the test of a living personal experience (see also the philosophy of Gaston Frommel). In this he resembled Frederick William Robertson, as also in the change which he introduced into pulpit style and in the permanence of his influence.

Vinet died at Clarens, Vaud. A considerable part of his work was not printed till after his death.
