= Stäket (Lund) =

Historical building in Lund, Sweden

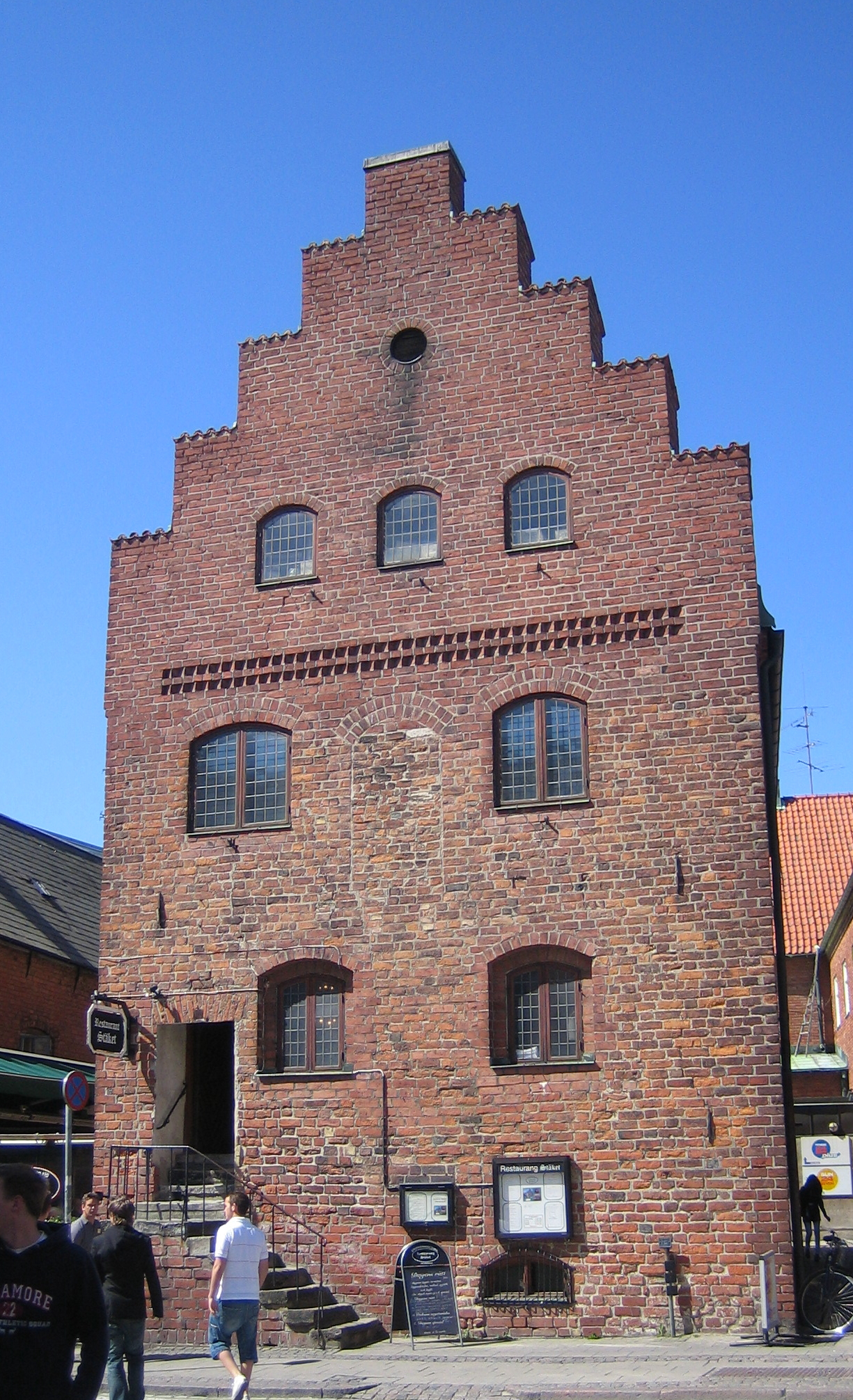
- Exterior towards the street
- Interactive map of the Stäket area

General information
- Architectural style: Brick Gothic
- Location: Stora Södergatan 6, Lund
- Coordinates: 55°42′5.5″N 13°11′32.5″E
- Year built: 16th century

Website
- Stäket, Restaurant

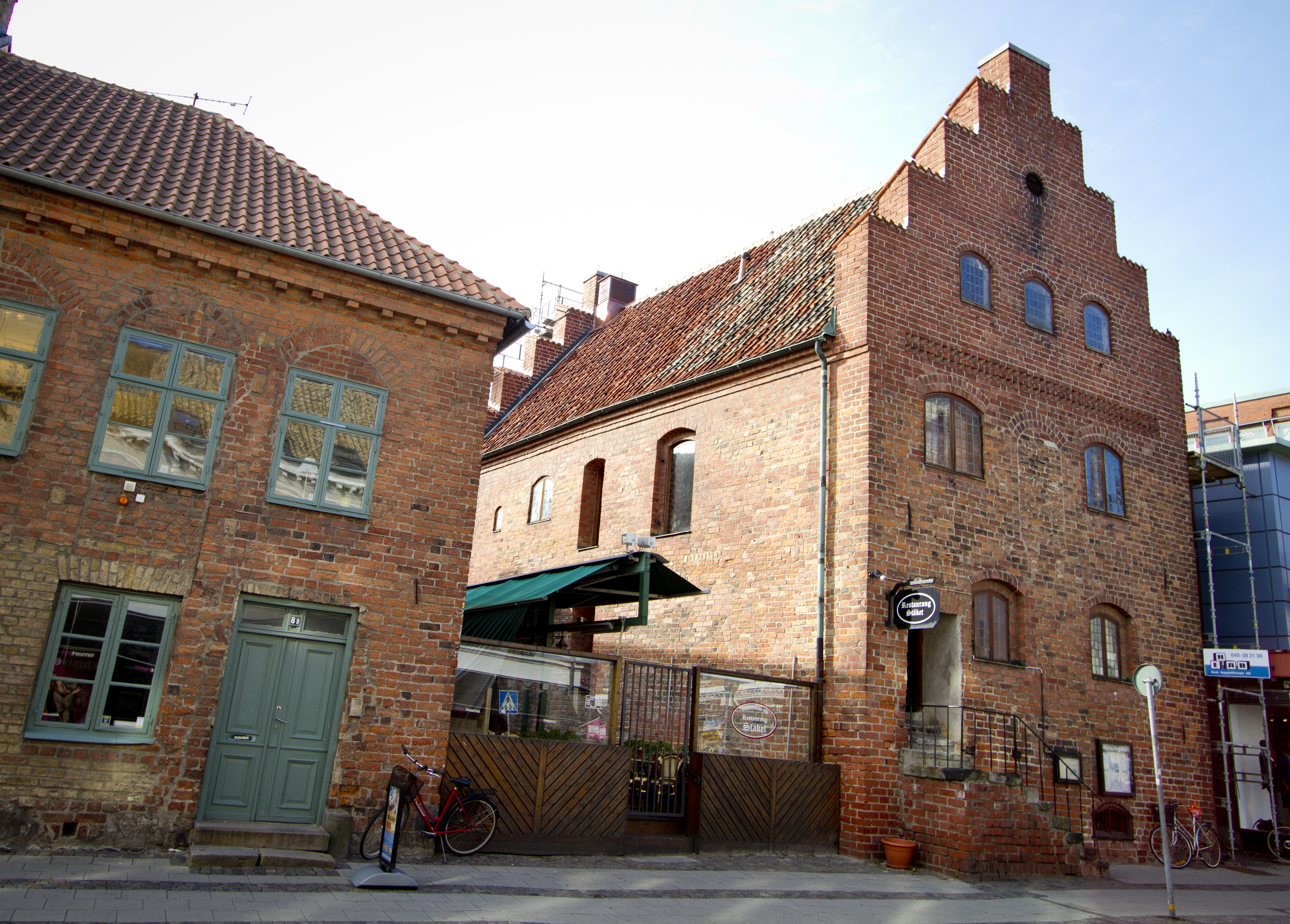
Mrs. Görvel’s Brick House and Stäket

Stäket, or Fru Görvels gård (Mrs. Görvel's Estate), is one of the oldest buildings remaining in Lund, Sweden. It is located on Stora Södergatan in central Lund and currently serves as a restaurant, which is also called Stäket.

== History ==
Stäket was likely constructed in the late Middle Ages or around the mid-1550s and was formerly known as Fru Görvels gård after Görvel Fadersdotter (Sparre), a wealthy widow who owned it in the late 16th century. Mrs. Görvel inherited the estate in the 1560s. She was Swedish and became one of the wealthiest women in the Nordic region through inheritance and marriage. It is unclear if she lived in the house herself and if it was constructed by her. She was buried in the Lund Cathedral where both her and her husband’s tombstone are preserved in the crypt.

Stäket is an example of a secular brick house of the 15th and 16th centuries. It has stepped gables and is located on one of the city’s main streets. Stäket comprised the northern wing of the estate. Parts of the south wing, now known as Fru Görvels tegelhus (Mrs. Görvel’s Brick House) or Borgska huset (The Borg House), have also been preserved.

The current name, Stäket, derives from one of the members of the Stäck family (according to some sources, the merchant Joseph Stäck; according to others, his son, the artist Joseph Magnus Stäck), who owned the house during the 19th century, when it also served in part as a studentkasern (student dormitory).

In its current form, Stäket is the result of a renovation carried out in 1957 and has since housed a restaurant, also named Stäket. Both Stäket and Fru Görvels tegelhus are listed buildings.
