= Si Frumkin =

Si Frumkin (born Simas Frumkinas) (November 5, 1930 – May 15, 2009) was a Lithuanian-born Jew who survived imprisonment at the Dachau Nazi concentration camp, and emigrated to the United States, where he became a prominent textile manufacturer and activist involved in issues relating to Soviet Jewry.

== Biography ==
Si Frumkin was born on November 5, 1930, in Kaunas, Lithuania, to Mykolas and Zila (née Waisapel) Frumkinas. When the German Army invaded Lithuania in 1941, Frumkin was sent to the city's Jewish ghetto with his parents. At the time of the ghetto's liquidation in 1944, Si Frumkin and his father were sent to Dachau concentration camp. His father died 20 days before the camp's liberation in 1945. After the war, Frumkin studied in Switzerland and England before briefly immigrating to Venezuela, where he was reunited with his mother, who had been deported to Poland.

Frumkin arrived in New York in 1949 and graduated from New York University with a bachelor's degree in 1953. Shortly after graduation, he moved to Los Angeles and took over Universal Drapery Fabrics, a downtown textile company. At night, he earned a master's degree in history at California State University, Northridge, which he completed in 1964.

When Frumkin became aware of the plight of Soviet Jews in the late 1960s, he at first tried, without success, to mobilize the local Jewish Federation Council to take action on the issue. Subsequently, he devoted himself to advocacy on behalf of Soviet Jewry, and founded the Southern California Council for Soviet Jews in 1968. With Zev Yaroslavsky, Frumkin protested against Soviet cultural events in Los Angeles. In 1970, Si Frumkin, Louis Rosenblum, Harold Light, and other local activists formed the Union of Councils for Soviet Jews as an umbrella organization for the various grassroots organizations in existence. As a founding member of the Association of Soviet Jewish Emigres, Frumkin assisted Soviet Jews who immigrated to Southern California settle in their new homes.

In his later years, Frumkin also worked to help Ethiopian Jews emigrate and was involved with the Israel-Christian Nexus, an organization of Jews and evangelical Christians that support Israel’s right to exist.

Si Frumkin died on May 15, 2009, in Los Angeles, California.
