= Frumkes =

Frumkes is an Ashkenazi Jewish matronymic surname derived from the female fiven name Frumka, a diminitive of Fruma. Notable people with the surname include:

- Lewis Frumkes (fl. from 1966), American educator, humorist, and writer
- Roy Frumkes (fl. from 1985), American film director

== See also ==
- Frumkin
