= David Cynamon =

Canadian company executive (born 1963)

David Cynamon (born October 19, 1963) is a Canadian company executive and was the former co-owner of the Toronto Argonauts from 2003 to 2010 with Howard Sokolowski. David is a co-chair at Mount Sinai Hospital In Toronto.

== Biography ==
Raised in Edmonton, during his childhood, Cynamon used to work at his father's sales stands at Edmonton Eskimos games. Later, he moved to Toronto and operated a group of pedicabs. Whilst in Toronto, he attended York University. There, he played football for the York Yeomen from 1983 to 1986, and was a triathlete. After university he worked as for KIK Corporation a detergent manufacturer, becoming an executive. Later, he changed company and became the CEO of KCP Income Fund.

== Toronto Argonauts ==
On 5 November 2003, with Sokolowski, Cynamon became an owner of the Toronto Argonauts. They purchased it from the Canadian Football League for $2 million. News that the Argonauts were owned by Toronto inhabitants was welcomed by fans of the team. Once they had bought it, they sought moving the team into a stadium that suited the Argonauts' regular attendance of 20,000-25,000. Attempts were made to move the Argonauts to either the University of Toronto, York University or to BMO Field but nothing came about.

On the field, the team won the 92nd Grey Cup in 2004 under the head coach Michael 'Pinball' Clemons, the first black coach to ever win the Grey Cup.

Despite Grey Cup success and increased sales, the team lost money over the six years. On 9 February 2010, they sold the team to David Braley who had originally loaned them half of the required money to purchase the Argonauts from the Canadian Football League.

== Charity ==
Cynamon and his family operate a charitable foundation The David and Stacey Cynamon Family Foundation. In 2007, with Sokolowski, Cynamon gave $4 million to The Hospital for Sick Children. Additionally, they also gave $5 million to a Jewish community centre for the development of Sports Complex in Toronto. In addition, the couple are very involved in the federal political scene, hosting many fundraising dinners for the PC party.
