= Mount Frome =

Mount Frome New South Wales
- Coordinates: 32°37′25″S 149°39′34″E
- Population: 136 (2016 census)
- Postcode(s): 2850
- Location: 258 km (160 mi) NW of Sydney; 176 km (109 mi) NE of Orange; 12 km (7 mi) E of Mudgee
- LGA(s): Mid-Western Regional Council
- State electorate(s): Electoral district of Dubbo
- Federal division(s): Calare

Mount Frome is a locality in New South Wales, Australia. It is located about 12 kilometres (7.5 mi) east of Mudgee. In the 2016 census, it recorded a population of 136 people. Historians say that the name 'Frome' comes from a shepherd boy, Tom Frome, who disappeared in the wilderness and was feared dead. During his memorial service, he returned, alive.
