= Rita Fromm =

German politician

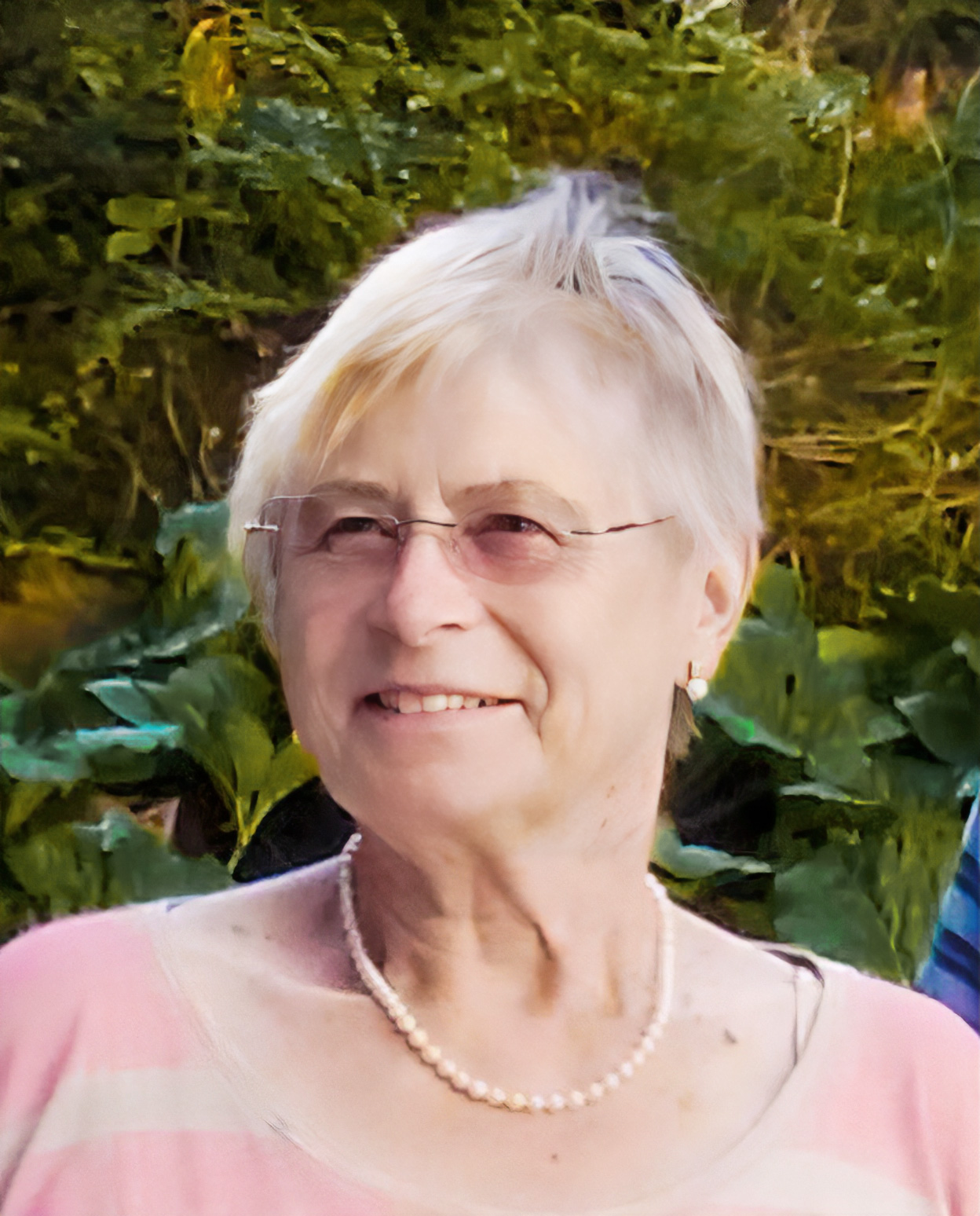
- Rita Fromm (2014)

Member of the Bundestag
- In office 4 November 1980 – 29 March 1983

Personal details
- Born: 1 May 1944 Josephshof
- Party: FDP

Rita Fromm (born 1 May 1944) was a German politician of the Free Democratic Party (FDP) and former member of the German Bundestag.

== Life ==
Rita Fromm was a member of the German Bundestag from 1980 to 1983. From 1989 to 2014 she was a city councillor in the Karlsruhe municipal council.

== Literature ==
Herbst, Ludolf; Jahn, Bruno (2002). Vierhaus, Rudolf (ed.). Biographisches Handbuch der Mitglieder des Deutschen Bundestages. 1949–2002 [Biographical Handbook of the Members of the German Bundestag. 1949–2002] (in German). München: De Gruyter - De Gruyter Saur. p. 1715. ISBN 978-3-11-184511-1.
