= Gaston Frommel =

French-Swiss protestant pastor

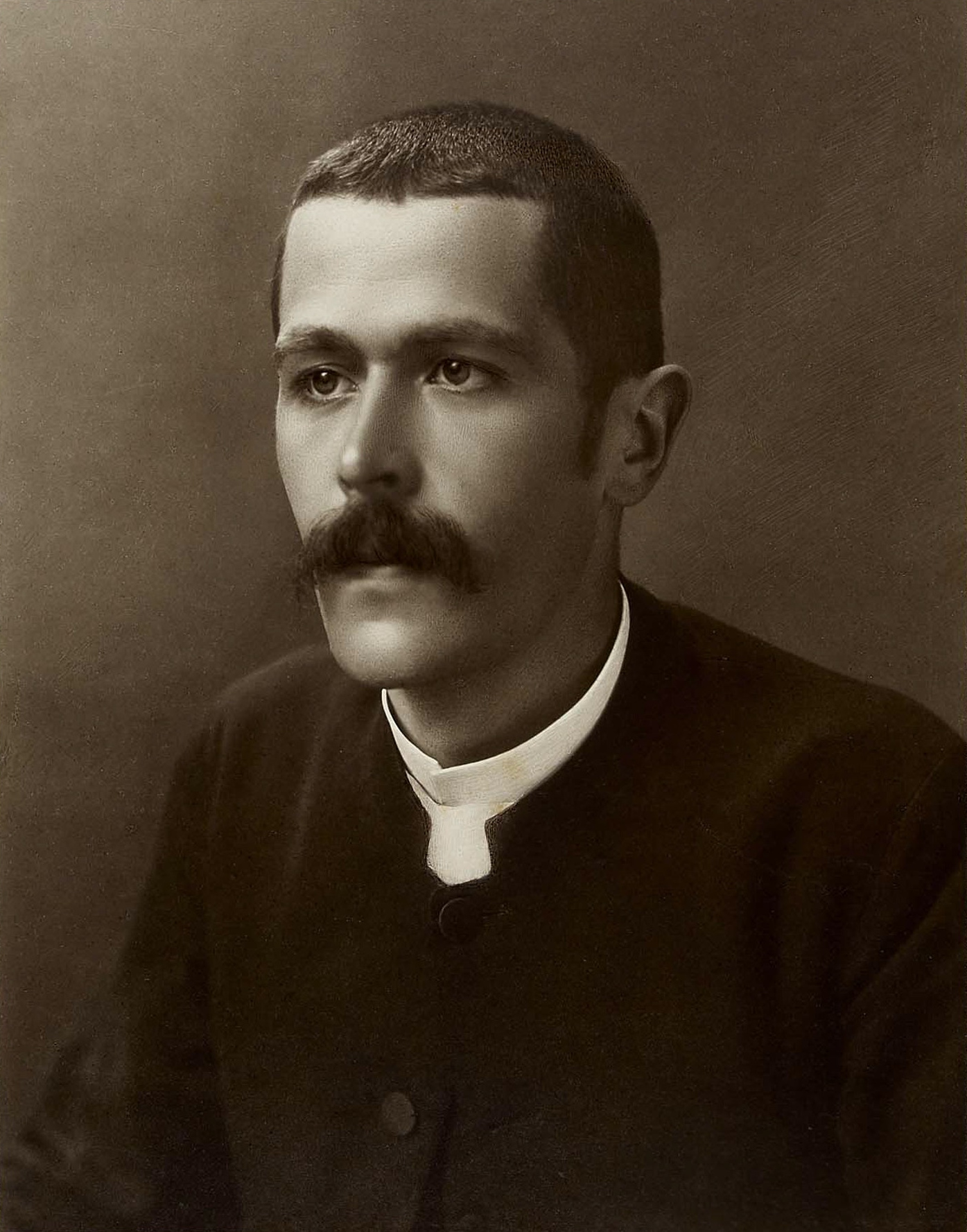
- undated portrait photo of Frommel by Frédéric Boissonnas

Gaston Frommel (November 25, 1862, in Altkirch, France – May 18, 1906, in Geneva, Switzerland) was a French-Swiss protestant pastor and professor of theology at the University of Geneva from 1894 until his death.

== Life ==
A Frenchman by birth, his family fled Alsace under German occupation in 1870 and he spent the rest of his life in Switzerland. He may best be described as continuing the spirit of Alexandre Rodolphe Vinet amid the mental conditions marking the end of the 19th century.

Like Vinet, he derived his philosophy of religion from a peculiarly deep experience of the Gospel of Christ as meeting the demands of the moral consciousness; but he developed even further than Vinet the psychological analysis of conscience and the method of verifying every doctrine by direct reference to spiritual experience. Both made much of moral individuality or personality as the crown and criterion of reality, believing that its correlation with Christianity, both historically and philosophically, was most intimate.

But while Vinet laid most stress on the liberty from human authority essential to the moral consciousness, the changed needs of the age caused Frommel to develop rather the aspect of man's dependence as a moral being upon God's spiritual initiative, "the conditional nature of his liberty." "Liberty is not the primary, but the secondary characteristic" of conscience; "before being free, it is the subject of obligation." On this depends its objectivity as a real revelation of the Divine Will.

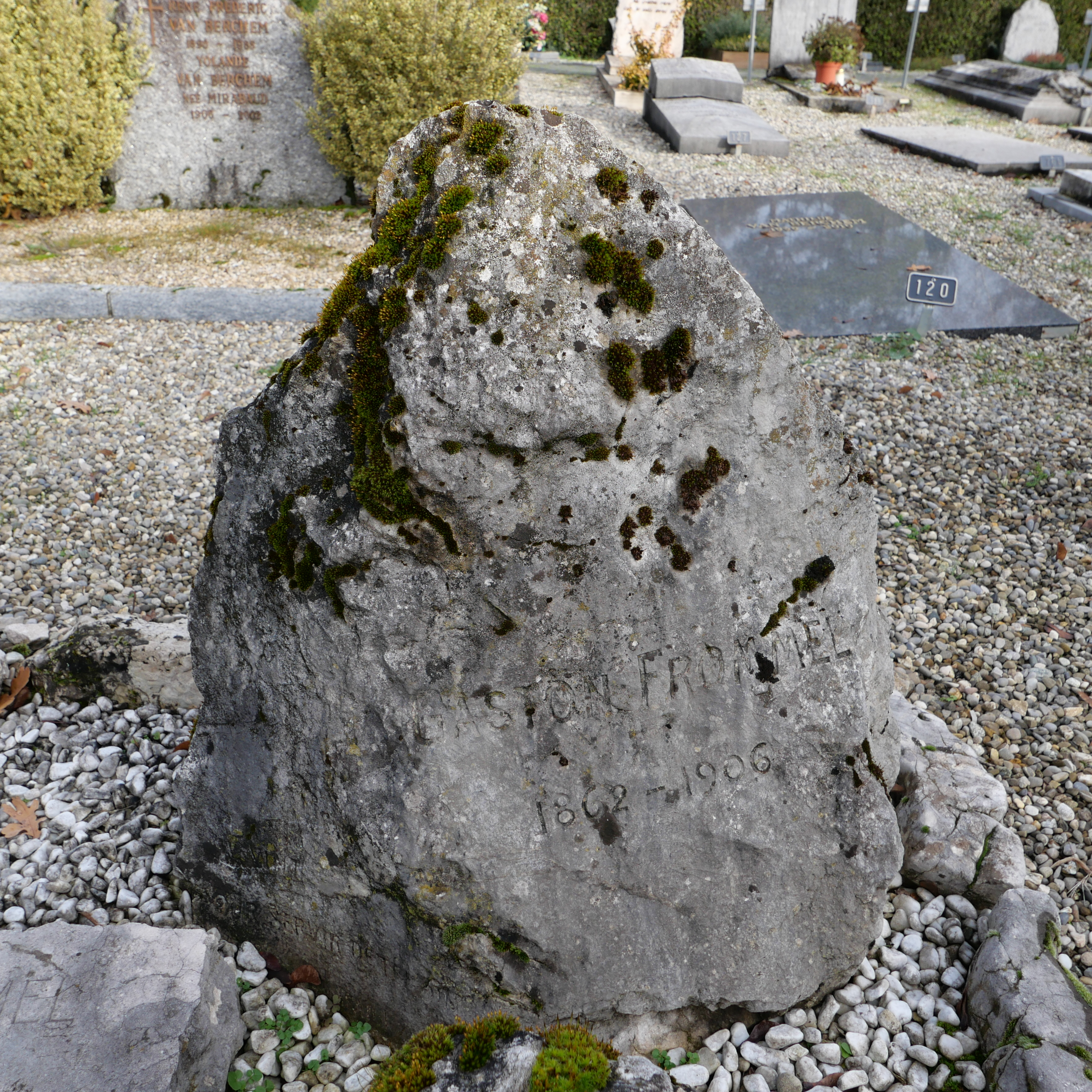
Frommel's grave at the New Cemetery of Cologny in the canton of Geneva.

Thus he claimed that a deeper analysis carried one beyond the human subjectivity of even Kant's categorical imperative, since consciousness of obligation was "une experience imposée sous le mode de l'absolu." By his use of imposée Frommel emphasized the priority of man's sense of obligation to his consciousness either of self or of God. Here he appealed to the current psychology of the subconscious for confirmation of his analysis, by which he claimed to transcend mere intellectualism. In his language on this fundamental point he was perhaps too jealous of admitting an ideal element as implicit in the feeling of obligation. Still he did well in insisting on priority to self-conscious thought as a mark of metaphysical objectivity in the case of moral, no less than of physical experience.

Further, he found in the Christian revelation the same characteristics as belonged to the universal revelation involved in conscience, viz., God's sovereign initiative and his living action in history. From this standpoint he argued against a purely psychological type of religion (agnosticisme religieux; as he termed it)--a tendency to which he saw even in A Sabatier and the symbolofidéisme of the Paris School—as giving up a real and unifying faith. His influence on men, especially the student class, was greatly enhanced by the religious force and charm of his personality. Finally, like Vinet, he was a man of letters and a penetrating critic of men and systems.

== Notes ==
Academic offices
Preceded by Auguste Bouvier	Chair of theology at the University of Geneva; 1894–1906	Succeeded by Georges Fulliquet
