= Barbara Frum =

Canadian journalist (1937–1992)

Barbara Frum OC
- Born: Barbara Rosberg; September 8, 1937; Niagara Falls, New York, U.S.
- Died: March 26, 1992 (aged 54); Toronto, Ontario, Canada
- Resting place: York Cemetery, Toronto
- Spouse: Murray Frum (m. 1957)
- Children: David Frum; Linda Frum; Matthew Frum
- Presenting career
- Show: As It Happens
- Network: CBC Radio
- Show: The Journal
- Network: CBC Television
- Country: Canada

Barbara Frum (née Rosberg; September 8, 1937 – March 26, 1992), OC was an American-born Canadian radio and television journalist, acclaimed for her interviews for the Canadian Broadcasting Corporation.

== Personal life ==
Barbara Frum was born Barbara Rosberg in Niagara Falls, New York, the eldest of three children of Harold Rosberg and Florence Hirschowitz Rosberg. Her family is Jewish. Frum's father, who was born in Kielce, Poland, immigrated to Canada as a child with his parents in 1913, and was the proprietor of Rosberg's Department Store in Niagara Falls, Ontario. Frum's mother was born in New York City, and moved to Canada in 1935, the year she got married. Frum grew up in Niagara Falls, Ontario. Attending Stamford Collegiate high school, where she was a classmate of Bob McAdorey, Barbara served on the student council. She was also a member of Theta Kappa Sigma, Alpha chapter, her high school sorority. She studied history at the University of Toronto, where she graduated with a BA in 1959. In 1957, she married Toronto dentist Murray Frum, who later became a real-estate developer. They had two children and adopted a third, an Indigenous child, Matthew. Her daughter, Linda Frum, was a Canadian senator and a member of the Canada-Israel Committee, and her son, David Frum became a political journalist and, after he moved to the United States, was a speechwriter for George W. Bush.

== Career ==
After her graduation, Frum undertook volunteer work in the community and began writing for the Toronto Star as a freelancer, specializing in social-issues stories. In 1968 she was hired by CBC-TV, where she conducted on-camera interviews of personalities such as Leonard Nimoy and Jacqueline Susann. In 1971, she joined CBC Radio as one of the first hosts of As It Happens, a newsmagazine program which used the telephone to conduct live interviews with newsmakers and other witnesses to news events, as well as quirky human-interest stories. Frum's skills as a tough, incisive and well-informed interviewer quickly made the program one of CBC Radio's most popular and enduring programs (it still airs today, in virtually the same format), and she continued to host until 1981.

Between October 1974 and July 1975, she hosted her own self-titled talk show, first locally broadcast in Toronto until May 1975 before the program moved to the national CBC network for seven shows in June and July 1975. The shows featured both interviews with personalities and special segments devoted to isolated topics.

In 1981, CBC Television created The Journal, a newsmagazine series which would follow The National each night at 10:22 p.m., and Frum and Mary Lou Finlay were hired as the show's hosts. On January 11, 1982, The Journal debuted as a showcase for features which delved more deeply into the day's news than the traditional newscast format of The National.

The show included field reports, short documentaries, public forums, debates, business, sports, and arts and science news, but Frum's interviews were the show's centrepiece, and made it one of Canadian television's most popular programs. After the first year, Frum became the sole host of the program, although Finlay continued to be associated with the program as a reporter and documentarian. Frum interviewed many notable people, including British Prime Minister Margaret Thatcher and Nelson Mandela.

She angered many when, on December 7, 1989, on The Journal, she refused to acknowledge that the École Polytechnique massacre, by a killer who proclaimed as he shot and stabbed women, "I hate feminists!" was an attack on women and feminism, saying: "Why do we diminish it by suggesting that it was an act against just one group?"

Frum was frequently parodied on CODCO by Greg Malone, whose portrayal involved the recurring catchphrase "But are you bitter?" Frum and Malone (in his Frum drag) also presented a Gemini Award together.

Frum was also the inspiration for the muppet "Barbara Plum", host of "The Notebook", on Canadian Sesame Street (later reworked as Sesame Park). In the episode "The Headline Hunter!" of the Canadian animated series The Raccoons, Frum herself portrayed a reporter called "Barbara LaFrum", who interviewed Cyril Sneer after his pigs told her of his unsavoury business practices.

== Awards and honours ==
Frum received four Alliance of Canadian Cinema, Television and Radio Artists (ACTRA) Awards, won the National Press Club of Canada Award for Outstanding Contribution to Canadian Journalism in 1975, and was named to the Order of Canada in 1979. A library in Toronto, called the Barbara Frum Public Library, is dedicated to her. In late 2022 Ms. Frum was inducted into the Canada Walk of Fame as the most influential woman in Canadian Broadcasting.

== Death and legacy ==
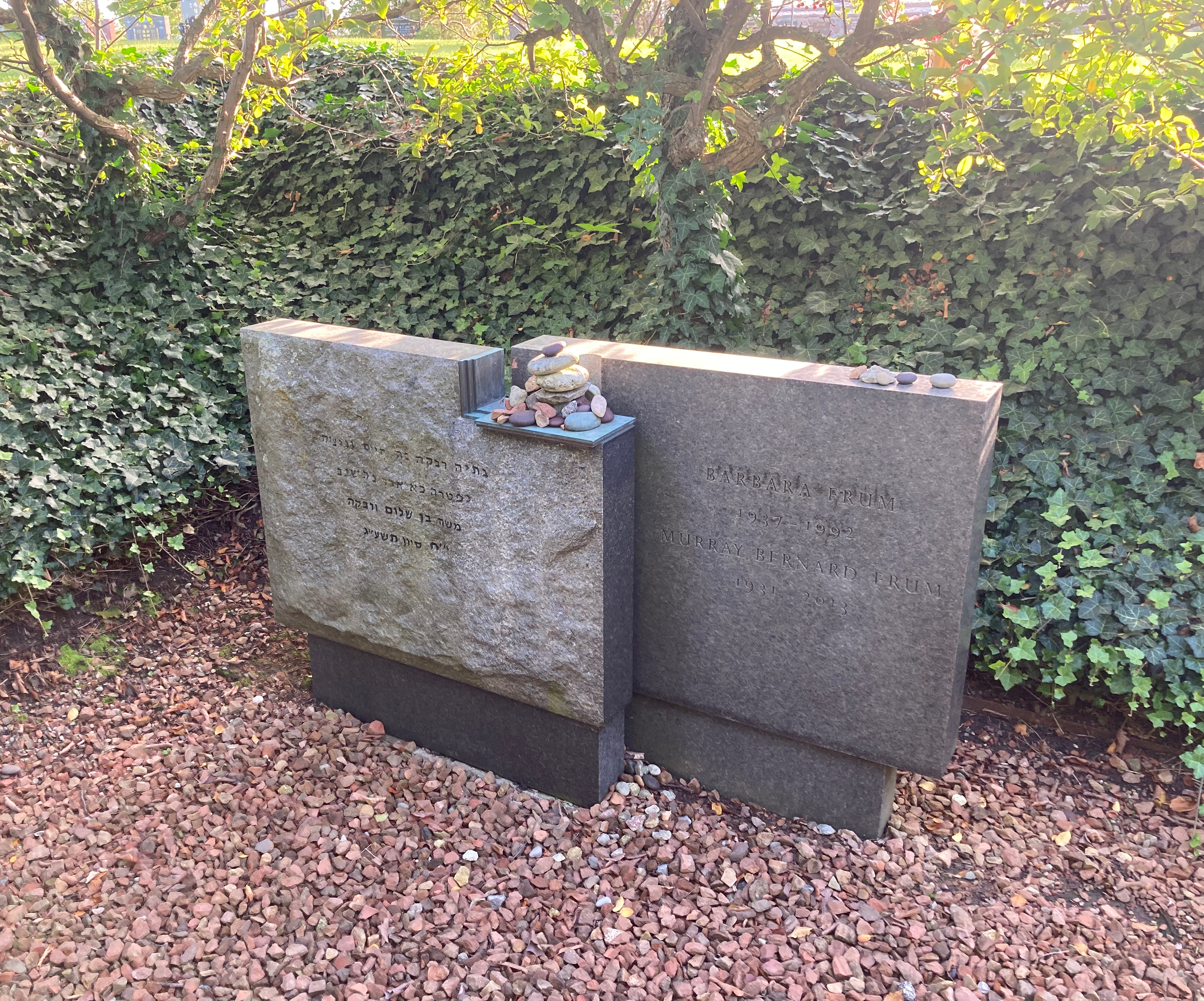
Graves of Barbara and Murray Frum at York Cemetery

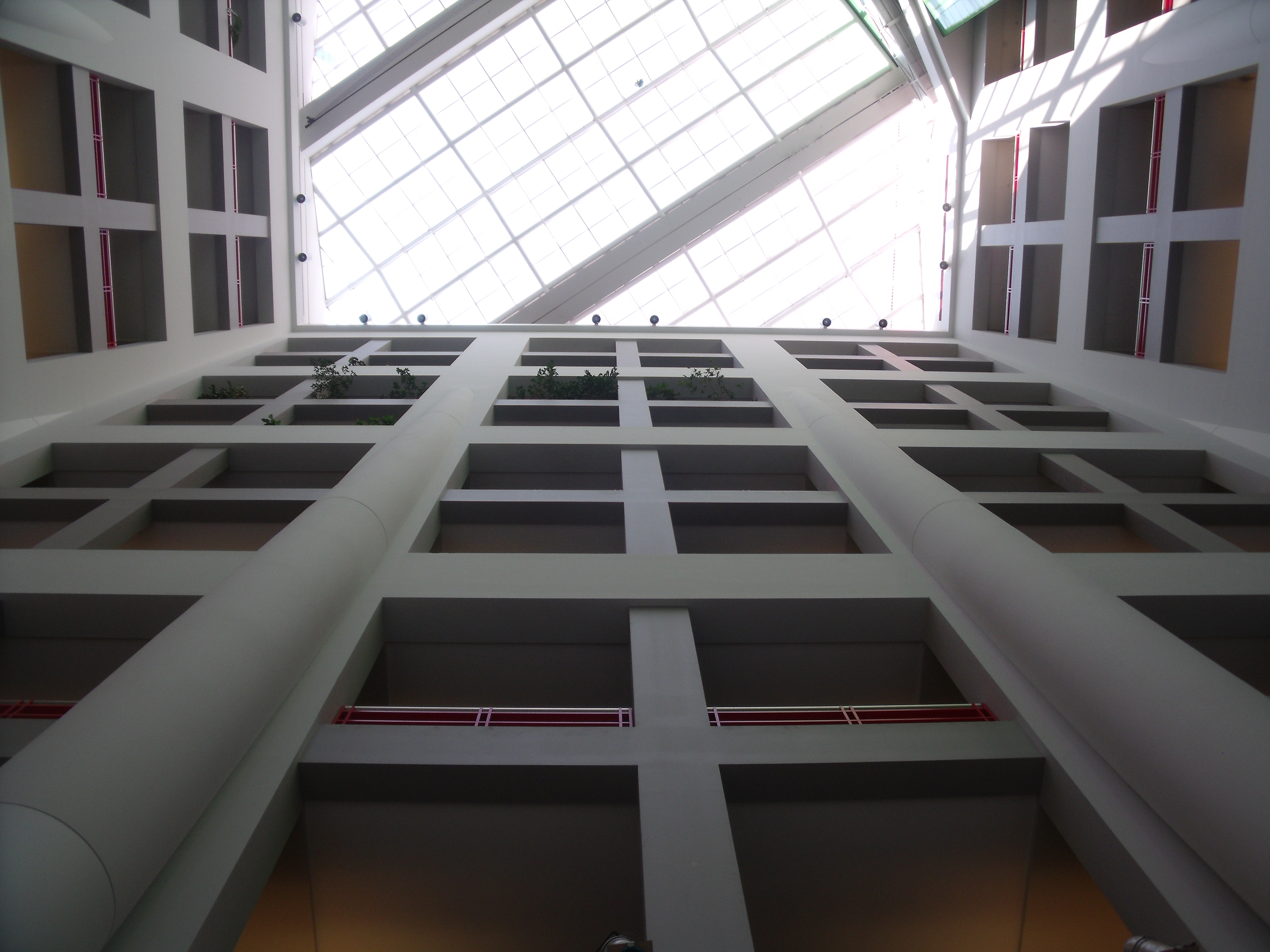
Barbara Frum Atrium, CBC, Toronto

Frum died of chronic leukemia on March 26, 1992. Her illness had been first diagnosed in 1974, but only a small circle of family and friends knew about it. On the evening of her death, virtually the entire broadcasts of both The National and The Journal were tributes to her and retrospectives of her career. Among the many tributes was an editorial cartoon depicting her at the gates of Heaven with a reporter's notebook, insisting on interviewing God. Several other editorial cartoons simply depicted The Journal's set with an empty anchor chair, or Frum likened to a CBC symbol.

She was originally buried at Pardes Shalom Cemetery and was later reinterred at York Cemetery, Toronto, where she is buried with her husband.

Following Frum's death, The National and The Journal were merged into a new program called Prime Time News.

The atrium in the CBC's Canadian Broadcasting Centre in Toronto, which opened in 1993, is named "Barbara Frum Atrium" in her honour.

The Toronto Public Library branch located at 20 Covington Rd was named in her honour and opened shortly after her death. The building of the library was donated by Murray Frum as part of a redevelopment project, Frum was in the foreground on the Canadian stamp honouring CBC in 1999, a television biography, The Life and Times of Barbara Frum, was broadcast on CBC in 2002, and a day lily has been named the "Barbara Frum Day Lily" in recognition of her enthusiasm for gardening.

Frum's daughter Linda, a conservative author and journalist, wrote a best-selling biography of her mother in 1996. She was appointed to the Senate of Canada as a Conservative by Prime Minister Stephen Harper in August 2009. Frum's son, David, is a political journalist and author of several books. He collaborated with others in coining the phrase "Axis of Evil" while a speechwriter for George W. Bush. Frum's adopted son Matthew, a First Nations child whom the Frums adopted in the 1960s during the Sixties Scoop, had problems as a teenager, and ultimately reclaimed his aboriginal roots and renewed contact with his birth parents.
