= Frome River =

Frome
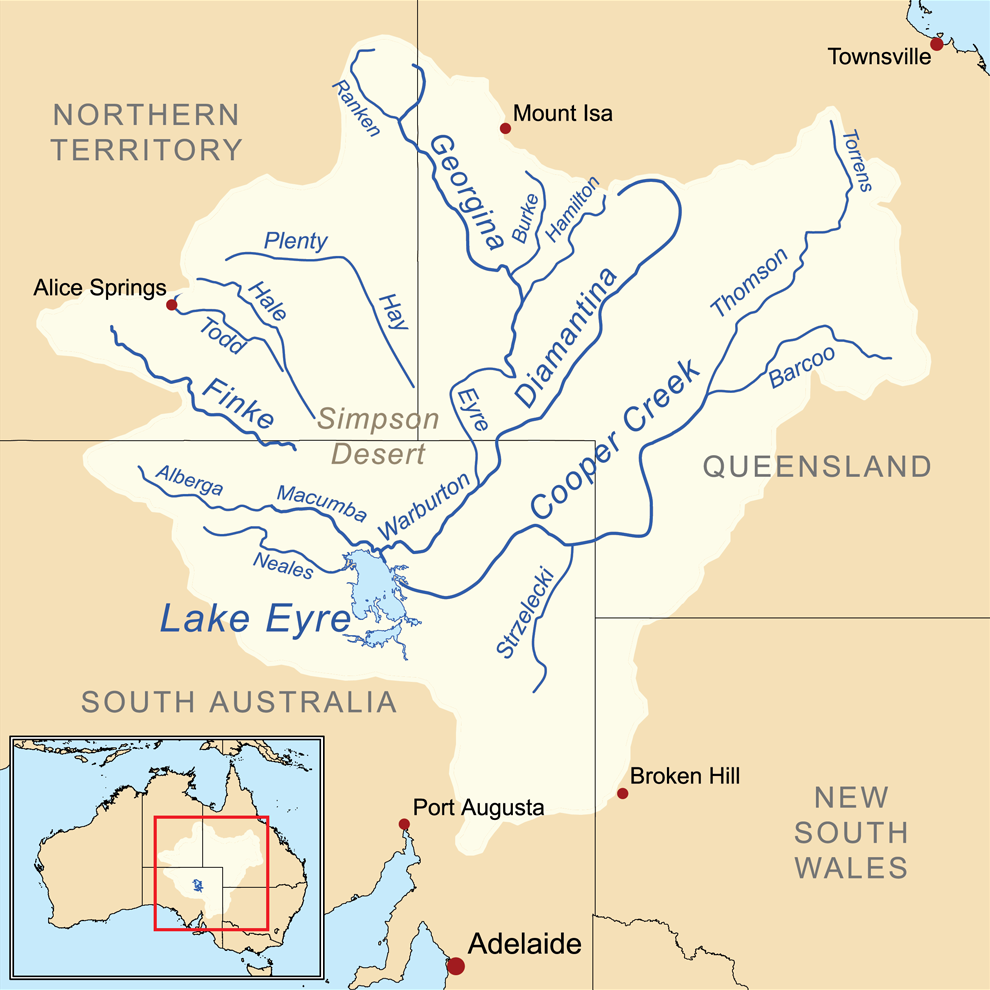
- Map of the Lake Eyre Basin

- Location of the river mouth in South Australia
- Etymology: Captain Edward Frome

Location
- Country: Australia
- State: South Australia

Physical characteristics
- Source: Flinders Ranges
  - location: near Mount Rose
- Mouth: Lake Eyre
  - coordinates: 29°5′6″S 137°54′14″E
- Length: 245 km (152 mi)
- Basin size: 18,200 km^{2} (7,000 sq mi)

Basin features
- River system: Lake Eyre Basin

The Frome River is an ephemeral river in the Australian state of South Australia located within the Lake Eyre basin. Its source is near Mount Rose in the northern Flinders Ranges and it discharges into the south-eastern side of the northern part of Lake Eyre.

The river was named by the British explorer, Edward John Eyre on 27 August 1840 after Captain Edward Frome who was the Surveyor General of South Australia at the time.

== See also ==
- List of rivers of Australia § South Australia
- Frome (disambiguation)
