= Allan Fromme =

Allan Fromme (June 14, 1915 – January 30, 2003) was an American psychologist, teacher, and writer. He became known for what has been characterized as a warmhearted, common-sense approach to life's day-to-day concerns. After graduating from Columbia University, Fromme spent 50 years as a therapist in New York City. Over this time, he made numerous television and radio appearances, authored multiple articles in popular magazines, and wrote eight books. He also taught at City College of New York, Sarah Lawrence College, and Columbia University.

Fromme's books include "ABC of Child Care," "Our Troubled Selves: A New and Positive Approach," "The Book for Normal Neurotics," "The Ability to Love," "Life After Work: Planning It, Living It, Loving It," "A Woman's Critical Years," and "The Psychologist Looks at Sex and Marriage." Fromme was also known for his broadcast appearances offering advice and for several quotable quotes.
