= Frohm =

Frohm is a Germanic-language surname, a variant of Fromm. Notable people with the surname include:

- Linda Frohm (born 1977), Swedish politician
- Mauritz Frohm, Swedish architect

== See also ==
- Frahm, Frohm/Frohms, From, Frome, Fromer, Fromm, Fromme, Frommel, Frommer/Frommert, Froom, Froome, Frum, Frumer, Vroom, Vrooman, Vroome, Vroomen/Vromen/Vroemen
