= Wilhelm Frahm =

German mathematician

Wilhelm Frahm (14 May 1849 – 17 August 1875) was a German mathematician who worked on algebraic geometry. He was born in Rendsburg, Schleswig-Holstein, and studied mathematics in Tübingen. He died in Munich of typhus.

== Bibliography ==
- Frahm, W. (1874), "Bemerkung über das Flächennetz zweiter Ordnung", Mathematische Annalen, 7 (4), Springer Berlin / Heidelberg: 635–638, doi:10.1007/BF02104932, ISSN 0025-5831, S2CID 125005804
