= Fruma =

Fruma, diminutives: Frumka, Frumke is an Ashkenazi Jewish feminine given name. Rabbi Shmuel Gorr, an Israeli genealogist, claims that the derivation from the word frum is an erroneous "folk etymology", and in fact it is dervied from the French word frommet, a species of grape. He claimed some elder women retailed this French form, Frommet or Frummet, Yiddish: פרומעט. Other forms he listed are: Froma, Fromme, Frommel, Frumme, Frummel, Frumie.

Patronymic surnames Frumin, Frumkin, Frumes, and Frumkes are derived from it. Notable people with the name include:

- Fruma Arest (1913–1991), Soviet geophysician and gravimetrician, and cartographer, pioneer of Turkmenistan geological survey
- Fruma Klass, mother of William Tenn
- Frumka Płotnicka, Polish WWII resistance fighter
- Fruma Rostova, Soviet revolutionary and engineer, wife of Mykola Shchors, Soviet Red Army commander

== See also ==
- Frumka, the Haredi burqa
- Fruma, a major region in the Minecraft server Wynncraft
