= Linda Frum =

Canadian politician

The Honourable Linda Frum
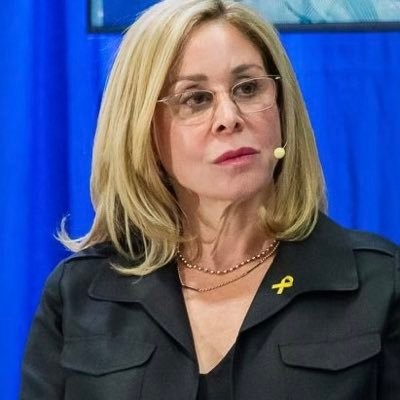

Canadian Senator from Ontario
- In office August 27, 2009 – August 27, 2021
- Nominated by: Stephen Harper
- Appointed by: Michaëlle Jean

Personal details
- Born: January 13, 1963 (age 63) Toronto, Ontario, Canada
- Party: Conservative
- Spouse: Howard Sokolowski
- Relations: David Frum (brother)
- Children: 3
- Parent(s): Barbara Frum; Murray Frum
- Education: Havergal College
- Alma mater: McGill University (BA)
- Occupation: Senator, author, journalist

Linda Frum (born January 13, 1963) is a Canadian author, journalist, and political figure. A member of the Conservative Party, she was member of the Senate of Canada for Ontario from 2009 until 2021. She announced her retirement from the Senate effective August 27, 2021 to devote more time to other pursuits such as her role as chair of the board of the Jewish Federation of Greater Toronto. In 2025, she became the Chair of the Board of UN Watch, a Geneva-based NGO which monitors the performance of the United Nations according to the yardstick of its charter and promotes human rights. She also serves on the board of the Azrieli Foundation.

== Early life and education ==
Born in Toronto, Ontario, to a Jewish family, Frum is the daughter of Barbara Frum, a journalist, and Murray Frum, a real estate developer. Her brother David Frum is a political author and journalist, and was a speech writer for George W. Bush and helped coin the phrase "Axis of Evil". Another brother, Matthew Frum, was adopted and is of aboriginal ancestry. Frum attended Havergal College and received a Bachelor of Arts degree from McGill University, Montreal in 1984.

== Career ==
She has served as a volunteer for many community organizations. She is an honorary patron of the Jerusalem Foundation. and NGO Monitor.

Frum is a former contributing editor to Maclean's, and was a columnist with the National Post from 1998 to 2002 and again from 2006 to 2007. In 1996 she won a Gemini Award for Best Social-Political Documentary Program for the film Ms. Conceptions.

In 2006, she was chair of the Women's Division of the United Jewish Appeal. She is a past board member of Mount Sinai Hospital, Upper Canada College, The Bishop Strachan School, the Art Gallery of Ontario Foundation, Soulpepper Theatre, and the Ontario Arts Council.

In 2012, Minister Jason Kenney appointed Senator Frum Co-Chair of the Advisory Council for the 2013 Task Force for International Cooperation on Holocaust Education, Remembrance, and Research. In 2013, Minister Rona Ambrose appointed Frum to sit on a task force to promote the participation of women on corporate boards. In December 2013, Frum and her husband co-chaired the Jewish National Fund's Negev Dinner in honour of Prime Minister Stephen Harper. The dinner set records for both attendance and fundraising: 4,000 people attended and $5.7m was raised for the Stephen J. Harper Bird Sanctuary Visitor and Education Centre in Hula Valley, Israel.

She has a Conservative affiliation and represents Ontario and was a director of the Conservative Fund, the party's fundraising arm, until 2021. She served as Chair of the Conservative Senate Caucus from 2015 to 2017. She announced her intention to retire from the Senate on August 27, 2021.

From 2020 until 2022 she was chair of the board of United Jewish Appeal of Greater Toronto.

== Personal life ==
Frum lives in Toronto with her husband Howard Sokolowski, a real estate developer and former co-owner of the Toronto Argonauts of the Canadian Football League, and her three children. In 2006, she and her husband received the Human Relations Award from the Canadian Council of Christians and Jews.

She has authored two books, and edited a third. The two she wrote are: Linda Frum's Guide to Canadian Universities (1987, with an updated edition published in 1990) and Barbara Frum: A Daughter's Memoir (1996). In June 2010, she received an Honorary Doctorate from Yeshiva University. In June 2019, she was awarded an honorary degree from Hebrew University for her leadership based on the principles of equality, freedom and human rights.
