= Howard Sokolowski =

Property developer

Howard Sokolowski, OOnt is a property developer, philanthropist and sport business owner from Toronto. He is the husband of Linda Frum and was the former co-owner of the Toronto Argonauts with David Cynamon from 2003 to 2010. His parents, Henry and Eva Sokolowski, were Holocaust survivors from Poland.

== Biography ==
Sokolowski was born to a Jewish family and raised in Toronto and attended York University. Upon graduation he went into property development, eventually co-founding Tribute Communities. Over the next 25 years, the company went on to develop more than 25,000 homes. Later, Sokolowski founded another property development company, Metropia. At the moment, Howard Sokolowski serves as chairman and chief executive officer at Metropia, where he has developed over 14,000 homes.

He is a benefactor of Mount Sinai Hospital, the UJA Federation, Yad Vashem, the Bishop Strachan School, the Art Gallery of Ontario, the Gardiner Museum, York University among other institutions. Sokolowski has received awards from J.D. Powers and Associates, the Ontario Home Builders Association, and the Greater Toronto Home Builders Association (BILD) including Project of the Year, Community of the Year and Builder of the Year. In 2025 Howard Sokolowski was awarded BILD's highest honour, the Lifetime Achievement Award recognizing his decades of impact to the GTA and beyond.

== Personal life ==
He is married to the Honourable Linda Frum, a writer and former Conservative member of the Senate of Canada. In 2011, Sokolowski was appointed to the Order of Ontario for 'his contributions to the arts, healthcare and education'.

== Toronto Argonauts ==
On 5 November 2003, Sokolowski and David Cynamon purchased the Toronto Argonauts from the Canadian Football League. Immediately, on assuming control of the club, they sought moving the team into a smaller stadium. The Rogers Centre (formerly called the SkyDome until 2005) has a capacity of over 50,000 and although attendance at games increased during their ownership, it rarely was over 25,000. This made the stadium cavernous and unappealing to supporters. Discussions were made to play games at either University of Toronto, York University or BMO Field but all of them fell through.

On the field, the team won the 92nd Grey Cup in 2004 under the head coach Michael 'Pinball' Clemons, the first black coach to ever win the Grey Cup.

Nevertheless, despite on field success and increased ticket attendance, without a purpose-built stadium, the team lost money over the six years of Sokolowski's and Cynamon's ownership. It was eventually sold to David Braley on 9 February 2010.
