= Vroomen =

Vroomen is a Dutch surname.Notable people with the surname include:

- Gerard Vroomen (born 1971), Dutch engineer, businessman
- Heinz Vroomen (1918–2003), Dutch footballer

== See also ==
- Frahm, Frohm, From, Fromer, Fromm, Fromme, Frommel, Frommer/Frommert, Frum, Frumer, Vroom
