= Mauritz Frohm =

Swedish architect

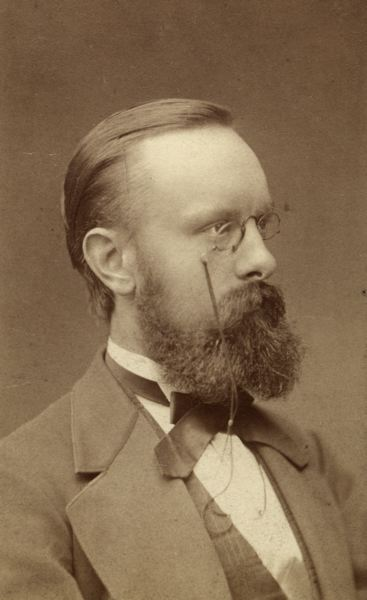
- Born: Mauritz Bernhard Julius Frohm; September 22, 1840; Helsingborg, Sweden
- Died: March 4, 1912 (aged 71); Helsingborg, Sweden
- Known for: Art (drawing, etching), architecture
- Movement: Renaissance Revival architecture

Mauritz Bernhard Julius Frohm (1840 – 1912) was a Swedish architect and Helsingborg's first city architect. He held the post between the years 1868 and 1903 and left behind several significant buildings in the city.

== Early life, education and practice ==
Fromm was born on September 22, 1840, in Helsingborg, the son of jeweler Jonas Fromm and his wife Christina (née Ramberg). He also had a brother named Arvid who worked as a penman but later migrated to America. In 1856 Fromm completed his education in the public education system in Helsingborg and then moved to Gothenburg where he began studying at the Chalmerska slojdskolan (Later Chalmers University of Technology). At that time, the school was a lower technical educational institution that, among other things, offered architecture education as an alternative to higher education at the Royal Institute of Art. It was probably there that he received his education in architecture.

In 1865 Frohm returned to Helsingborg and in 1868 he was made the city's city architect. As an urban architect, the appearance of the buildings he designed was dominated by richly decorated and often classicist buildings. He left his job in 1903. Frohm never married and died in 1912. Alfred Hellerström succeeded him as city architect.
