= Frahm =

Frahm is a surname which may refer to:

- Art Frahm (1907-1981), American painter
- Dick Frahm (1906-1977), American football halfback
- Herbert Frahm, birth name of Willy Brandt (1913-1992), West German politician
- Jan-Peter Frahm (1945-2014), German botanist
- Jasper Frahm (born 1996), German road and track cyclist
- Jens Frahm (born 1951), German biophysicist and physicochemist
- Joel Frahm (born 1970), American jazz saxophonist
- Jordy Frahm (born 2002), American softball player
- Leanne Frahm (1946–2025), Australian writer of speculative fiction
- Matt Frahm (born 1990), American NASCAR driver
- Nicolai Frahm (born 1975), contemporary art advisor and collector
- Nils Frahm (born 1982), German musician
- Pernille Frahm (born 1954), Danish politician, teacher, and member of the Folketing
- Richie Frahm (born 1977), American former professional basketball player
- Sheila Frahm (born 1945), Republican senator representing Kansas
- W. Frahm, German mathematician

== See also ==
- Frahm, Frohm, From, Fromer, Fromm, Fromme, Frommel, Frommer/Frommert, Frum, Frumer
