= Fromer =

Fromer (Hebrew: פרומר), also transliterated Frumer, is a surname of Jewish origin, derived from the Yiddish word frum, meaning "devout" or "pious" in the sense of "committed to the observance of Jewish religious law" beyond the minimum requirements. It is also a German surname. Notable people with this surname include:

- Aryeh Tzvi Fromer, also spelled Aryeh Tzvi Frumer (1884–1943), Polish rabbi
- Jeanne Fromer, American legal scholar
- Liza Fromer (born 1970), Canadian TV host
- Marcelo Fromer (1961–2001), Brazilian guitarist
- Rebecca Fromer (1927–2012), American playwright
- Seymour Fromer (1922–2009) American museum founder

== See also ==
- Frahm, Frohm, From, Fromer, Fromm, Fromme, Frommel, Frommer/Frommert, Frum, Frumer
