= Merle Frohms =

German footballer (born 1995)

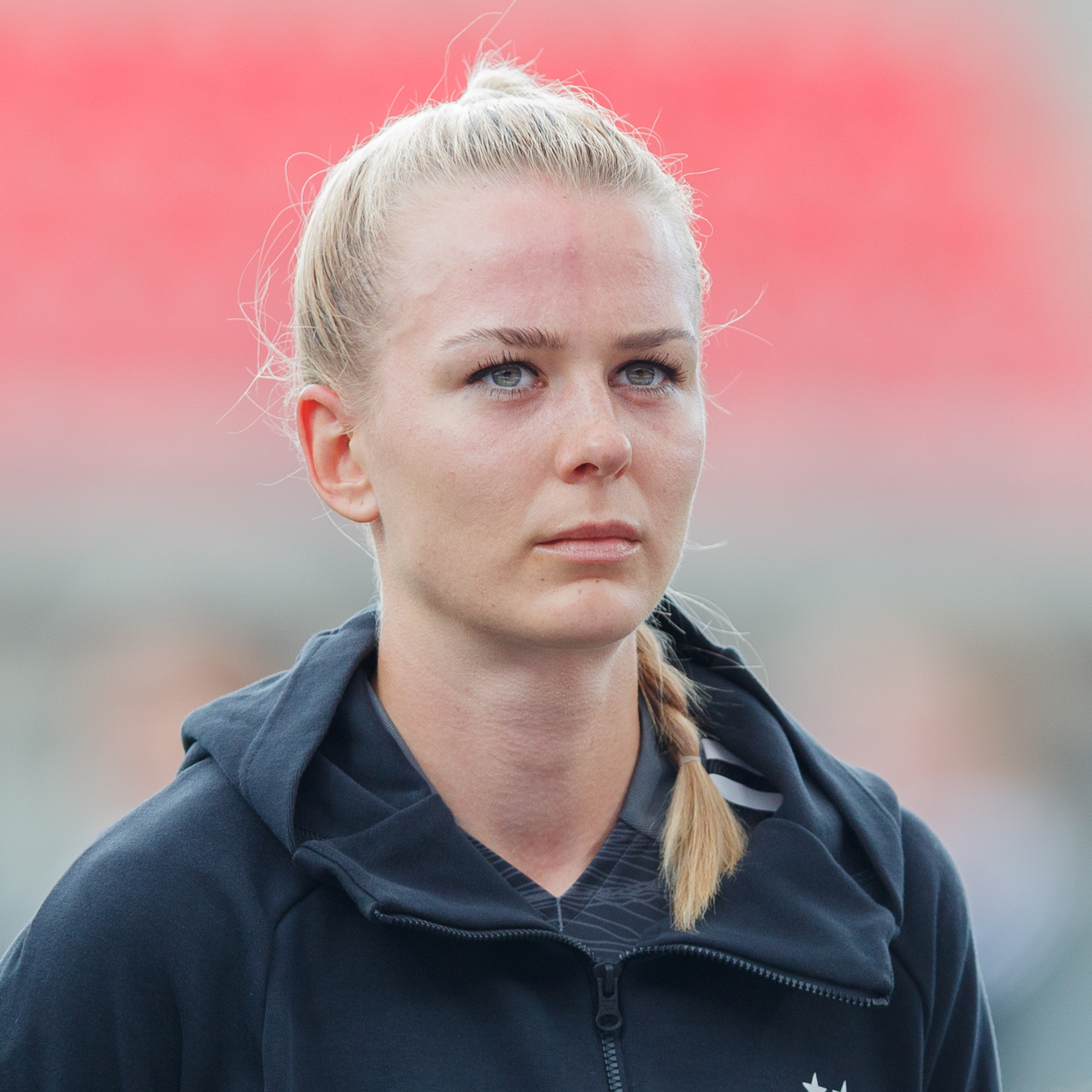
- Frohms with Germany in 2022

Personal information
- Full name: Merle Frohms
- Date of birth: 28 January 1995 (age 31)
- Place of birth: Celle, Germany
- Height: 1.73 m (5 ft 8 in)
- Position: Goalkeeper

Team information
- Current team: Real Madrid
- Number: 1

Youth career
- –2011: Fortuna Celle
- 2011–2012: VfL Wolfsburg

Senior career*
Years	Team	Apps	(Gls)
2012–2018	VfL Wolfsburg	12	(0)
2013–2018	VfL Wolfsburg II	40	(0)
2018–2020	SC Freiburg	37	(0)
2020–2022	Eintracht Frankfurt	43	(0)
2022–2025	VfL Wolfsburg	52	(0)
2025–	Real Madrid	21	(0)

International career
2010	Germany U15	2	(0)
2011	Germany U16	2	(0)
2010–2012	Germany U17	15	(0)
2012–2014	Germany U19	4	(0)
2014	Germany U20	4	(0)
2018–2024	Germany	52	(0)
Medal record
Women's football
Representing Germany
Olympic Games
Bronze medal – third place	2024 Paris	Team
UEFA Women's Championship
Runner-up	2022 England
UEFA Women's Nations League
Third place	2024 France–Netherlands–Spain
- * Club domestic league appearances and goals as of 12 November 2026

Merle Frohms (born 28 January 1995) is a German professional footballer who plays as a goalkeeper for Liga F club Real Madrid. She also played for the Germany national team.

== Club career ==
Frohms played together with boys for Fortuna Celle until 2011 and was signed by VfL Wolfsburg in late 2010. In her first season, she was part of the second team but wasn't used. On 9 December 2012, she debut in a 3–0 victory against FSV Gütersloh 2009 in what was her only game for the 2012–13 season. The following season she was moved to the second team as she played in sixteen matches for the team in the 2. Frauen-Bundesliga as the team finished in third place.

The 2014–15 season initially saw her contract being extended for another two years with sport director, Ralf Kellermann stating that "she has a great goalkeeping talent with such a perspective". It was during this season that she played another three games for the main club which included an appearance in the Champions League when she was a starter in the semi-final against Paris Saint-Germain. During this contract she was a substitute in both Wolfsburg victories in the DFB-Pokal Frauen in 2014–15 and 2015–16.

After another two years in the team, she moved to fellow Bundesliga club SC Freiburg where she played in 18 games for the club in the first season.

Frohms joined Eintracht Frankfurt in 2020, the club's first signing after it merged with 1. FFC Frankfurt.

On 15 February 2022, Frohms was announced at VFL Wolfsburg on a three year contract.

On 23 June 2025, Frohms joined Real Madrid on a three year deal.

== International career ==
Frohms' first appearance in an international tournament was the finals of the 2012 UEFA Women's Under-17 Championship where she played as the main keeper in the semi-final role against Denmark before stopping penalties from Chloé Froment and Ghoutia Karchouni in the final to give Germany the Under-17 title and also gaining a spot in the FIFA U-17 World Cup. Later that year she was chosen as the main goalkeeper for Germany at the 2012 FIFA U-17 Women's World Cup where she would play in all six of the matches as the national team finished in fourth place.

Frohms was called up to the Germany squad for the 2019 FIFA Women's World Cup.

On 18 June 2022, Frohms was called up to the 23-player Germany squad for the UEFA Women's Euro 2022.

Frohms was called up to the Germany squad for the 2023 FIFA Women's World Cup.

On 3 July 2024, Frohms was called up to the Germany squad for the 2024 Summer Olympics.

She announced her retirement from international football in September 2024.

== Career statistics ==
=== International ===
Appearances and goals by national team and year
National team	Year	Apps	Goals
Germany
Germany	2018	3	0
Germany	2019	6	0
Germany	2020	3	0
Germany	2021	10	0
Germany	2022	14	0
Germany	2023	11	0
Germany	2024	5	0
Total		52	0

== Honours ==
VfL Wolfsburg

- UEFA Women's Champions League : 2012–13, 2013–14
- Frauen-Bundesliga : 2012–13, 2013–14, 2016–17, 2017–18
- DFB Pokal : 2012–13, 2014–15, 2015–16, 2016–17, 2017–18, 2022-23, 2023-24

Germany U17

- UEFA Women's Under-17 Championship: 2012

Germany U20

- FIFA U-20 Women's World Cup: 2014

Germany

- Summer Olympics bronze medal: 2024
- UEFA Women's Championship runner-up: 2022
- UEFA Women's Nations League third place: 2023–24

Individual

- Silbernes Lorbeerblatt: 2024
