= From =

From may refer to:

== Media ==
- From (TV series), a sci-fi-horror series that debuted on Epix in 2022
- "From" (Fromis 9 song) (2024)
- "From", a song by Big Thief from U.F.O.F. (2019)
- "From", a song by Yuzu (2010)
- "From", a song by Bon Iver from Sable, Fable (2025)

== Other uses ==
- From (surname)
- From (SQL), computing language keyword
- Full range of motion, the travel in a range of motion
