= Fromme =

Fromme is a surname. Notable people with the surname include:

- Alex M. Fromme (1915–1982), Justice of the Kansas Supreme Court
- Allan Fromme (1916–2003) was an American psychologist, teacher, and writer
- Art Fromme (1883–1956), professional baseball pitcher
- Lynette Alice "Squeaky" Fromme (born 1948), American criminal and member of the Manson family who attempted to assassinate Gerald Ford

== See also ==
- Mount Fromme, a mountain on the North Shore of Vancouver, British Columbia
- Frohm, From, Fromm, Fromme, Frommel, Frommer, Frum
