= Simon Vroemen =

Dutch steeplechase runner

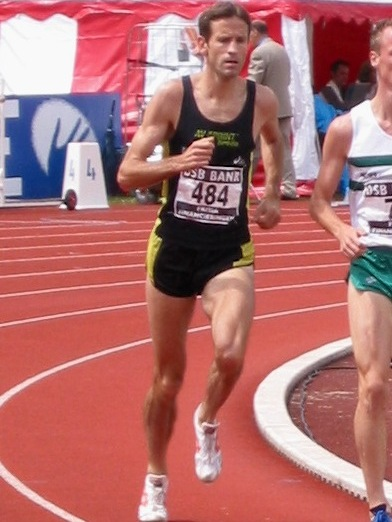

Personal information
- Full name: Simon Frans Vroemen
- Born: 11 May 1969 (age 57) Delft, Netherlands
- Years active: 1981-2006
- Height: 1.89 m (6 ft 2 in)
- Weight: 67 kg (148 lb)

Achievements and titles
- Personal best: steeplechase - 8:04.95 (2005)
Medal record
Men's athletics
Representing Netherlands
European Championships
Silver medal – second place	2002 Munich	3000 m steeplechase
- Updated on 18 October 2007

Simon Frans Vroemen (born 11 May 1969) is a Dutch runner, specialising in the steeplechase.

== Career ==
Originally a 1500 metres runner, he changed his focus in 1994 to the steeplechase, in which he has been internationally successful.

On 19 July 2002, he broke the nearly 20 year old European record by running 8:06.91 in Monaco. On 26 August 2005 in Brussels he broke his own European record, setting it at 8:04.95, which remained until 2009.

He placed 12th in the Sydney Olympic Games (2000) and 6th in the Athens Olympic Games (2004).

In July 2007, a year after his decision to quit the sport, Vroemen returned on the track at the Dutch National Championships. He started off as a pace runner, but went on to win the Dutch title. On 11 June 2008, at the age of 39, he won a race in Cottbus in 8:12.50, setting the third-best time of the year in the world and qualifying him for the Olympic Games in Beijing.

== Controversy ==
After 2007 Dutch National Championships, Vroemen requested a doping test and was tested positive for the banned anabolic steroid metandienone. He contested the outcome based on scientific evidence that his (legal) anti-asthma medication caused the test to report false positives. More than 1.5 years after the test and the missed opportunity to run at the Olympics, the Sports Court released Vroemen of the doping charges, based on scientific evidence that the allowed asthma medication triggered the test.

During these 1.5 years, the anti-doping authorities also tried to accuse Vroemen of using an illegal infusion in 2006. Vroemen was also declared innocent in this case and all charges were dropped.

He returned to racing and won the national steeple chase championship 3 more times in the years 2011, 2012 and 2013, to bring his total steeple chase championship count to 15 times. Vroemen retired from professional racing thereafter.

== Personal life ==
Vroemen has a degree in molecular sciences from the Wageningen University. He wrote his dissertation on the stress physiology of grasshoppers. He has since worked as an engineer for Shell and currently resides at Vught.

== Achievements ==
- 2000: 12th – Olympic Games in Sydney
- 2002: 2nd – European Championships in Munich
- 2003: 7th – World Championships in Paris
- 2004: 6th – Olympic Games in Athens
- 2005: 5th – World Championships in Helsinki

Records
Preceded by (France) Joseph Mahmoud	Men's Steeple European Record Holder; 2002-07-19 – 2009-07-03	Succeeded by (France) Bouabdellah Tahri
Awards
Preceded by Kamiel Maase	Herman van Leeuwen Cup; 2000; 2002	Succeeded by Kamiel Maase
Preceded by Kamiel Maase	Herman van Leeuwen Cup; 2000; 2002	Succeeded by Kamiel Maase
