= Frommel =

Frommel is a surname. Notable people with the surname include:

- Christoph Luitpold Frommel (1933-2026), German art historian
- Emil Frommel (1828-1896), German theologian and author
- Gaston Frommel (1862 - 1906), Swiss theologian, professor of theology
- Karl Ludwig Frommel (1789 – 1863), German landscape painter and engraver
- Richard Frommel (1854 - 1912), German obstetrician and gynecologist

== See also ==
- Frohm, From, Fromm, Fromme, Frommel, Frommer, Frum
