= Frommer =

Frommer is a surname. Notable people with the surname include:

- Arthur Frommer (1929–2024), American travel writer
- Dario Frommer (born 1963), American politician
- Jeremy Frommer, American entrepreneur
- Nico Frommer (born 1978), German footballer
- Paul Frommer (born 1944), American professor
- Rudolf Frommer (1868–1936), Hungarian weapon designer

== See also ==
- Frohm, From, Fromm, Fromme, Frommel, Frommer, Frum
