= Fromm =

Fromm is a German and Yiddish surname. Notable people with the surname include:

- Bella Fromm (1890-1972), German journalist
- Eric Fromm (born 1958), American former tennis player
- Erich Fromm (1900–1980), German-American Jewish psychologist and humanistic philosopher
- Frieda Fromm-Reichmann (1889–1957), psychoanalyst and doctor; wife of Erich
- Friedrich Fromm (1888–1945), German army officer
- Harold Fromm, American academic and writer
- Jake Fromm (born 1998), American football player
- Julius Fromm (1883–1945), inventor of the seamless latex condom
- Paul Fromm (activist) (born 1949), Canadian fascist
- Paul Fromm (philanthropist) (1906–1987), American wine merchant and musical patron
- Pete Fromm (born 1958), American novelist
- Rita Fromm (born 1944), German politician

== See also ==
- Fromm Verlag, an imprint of VDM Publishing
- Frohm, From, Fromm, Fromme, Frommel, Frommer, Frum
