= Aryeh Tzvi Frumer =

Polish Orthodox rabbi, rosh yeshiva and posek

Rabbi Aryeh Tzvi Frumer
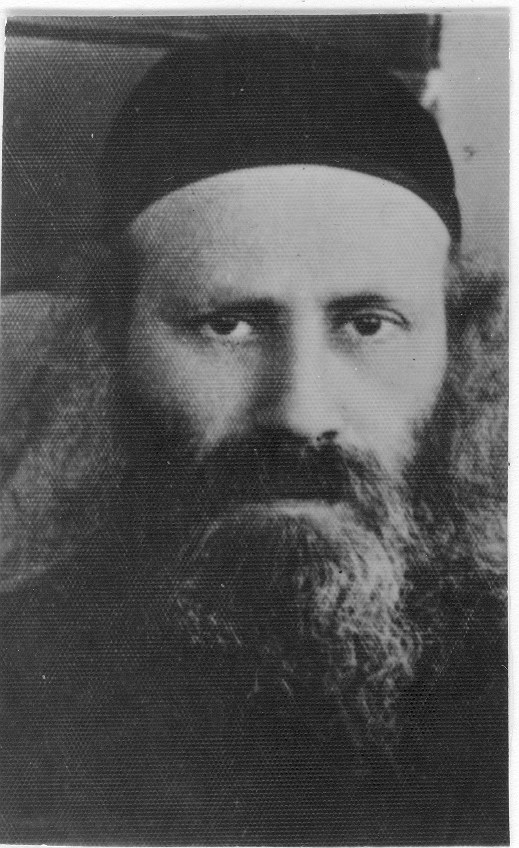
- Rabbi Frumer in 1932

Personal life
- Born: Aryeh Tzvi Frumer; 1884 Czeladź, Piotrków Governorate, Congress Poland
- Died: May 2, 1943 (age 58–59) Majdanek concentration camp, Lublin District, General Government
- Spouse: Esther Schweitzer
- Children: Dov; Avrohom; Binyamin; Moshe; Milkah; Miriam Kayla
- Parent(s): Hanoch Hendel Frumer; Miriam Kayla
- Education: Sochatchov yeshiva

Religious life
- Religion: Judaism
- Denomination: Orthodox

Jewish leader
- Predecessor: Rabbi Meir Shapiro
- Position: Rosh yeshiva
- Yeshiva: Yeshivas Chachmei Lublin
- Began: 1934
- Ended: 1939
- Other: Rosh yeshiva, Sochatchov yeshiva Rav of Kozhiglov

Aryeh Tzvi Frumer (Hebrew: אריה צבי פרומר; also spelled Fromer or Frommer; 1884 – 2 May 1943) was a leading Orthodox rabbi, rosh yeshiva, and posek (halachic authority) in 20th-century Poland. Known as the Kozhiglover Rav after his short term as Rav of Koziegłowy, he served as rosh yeshiva of the yeshiva in Sochaczew (Sochatchov) from 1910 to 1914 and rosh yeshiva of Yeshivas Chachmei Lublin, the premier yeshiva of Poland, from 1934 to 1939. During the German occupation of Poland, he was incarcerated in the Warsaw Ghetto. In spring 1943 he was deported to the Majdanek concentration camp, where he was murdered. His book of responsa Eretz Tzvi (The Fairest Land) is widely quoted to this day.

== Family background ==
Frumer was born in Czeladź, Poland, to Hanoch Hendel Frumer, a tailor. He had one brother, Reuven, and two sisters, Taibel Leah and Faigel. His mother, Miriam Kayla, died when he was three years old. After his father remarried, he was sent to learn in a cheder in the nearby town of Wolbrum, where he boarded with his mother's relatives. Here he proved himself to have a sharp mind and understanding. People began calling him by the Yiddish translation of his name, "Leib Hirsch". At the age of 12 he went to learn in the yeshiva ketana in Amstov, near Częstochowa, where he outpaced boys his own age in their studies. A year later, after his bar mitzvah, he moved to the yeshiva of the Sochatchover Rebbe, the Avnei Nezer, in Sochaczew. Here Frumer found fellow students at the same high intellectual level as he, and grew into a Torah scholar of note. He became a devout Sochatchover Hasid, and went on to serve the first three Sochatchover Rebbes.

== Rav and rosh yeshiva ==
At age 18 Frumer married his cousin, Esther Schweitzer, daughter of Yehuda Shraga Schweitzer of Lvov, and was supported by his father-in-law in the latter's home in Mysłowice so he could continue his Torah studies. In 1913 Frumer published his first book, Siach HaSadeh, a series of essays explaining topics in the Gemara, especially those in Seder Moed. In 1910, upon the death of the Avnei Nezer, his son and successor, Rabbi Shmuel Bornsztain, appointed the 26-year-old Frumer to succeed his late father as rosh yeshiva in the yeshiva in Sochaczew. This yeshiva enrolled hundreds of young men and operated until the outbreak of World War I.

During World War I the city of Sochaczew and the yeshiva were destroyed in a fire, and Frumer moved with his family to Warsaw. At war's end, when the second Sochatchover Rebbe relocated to Zgierz, Frumer succeeded his uncle, Rabbi Yitzchok Gutensztain, as Rav of Koziegłowy. He established a yeshiva in his home which grew to 50 students. Thereafter he became known as the Kozhiglover Rav. Frumer was forced to leave the city in 1921, either due to the enmity of a neighboring priest or a disgruntled rich man who had lost a din Torah. Sochatchover Hasidim living in Zawiercie asked him to serve as their Rav and he acquiesced. He also established a yeshiva in that city. A while later, Frumer was nominated to be the Rav of Zawiercie, but lost to another candidate, and moved with his yeshiva to nearby Sosnowiec. With each move, he gained more students and more admirers from surrounding towns, leading to the decision of the directors of Yeshivas Chachmei Lublin, the premier yeshiva of Poland, to invite him in 1934 to be the successor to Rabbi Meir Shapiro, who had died suddenly in late 1933. Frumer brought "a new spirit of scholarship, righteousness, and depth" to the hundreds of exceptional students at Yeshivas Chachmei Lublin. He served as rosh yeshiva until the Germans closed down the yeshiva in 1939.

In 1935 Frumer spent four months visiting Palestine. In 1938 he published his second work, ארץ צבי (Eretz Tzvi) (the title being another name for the Land of Israel and a play on his own name), a book of responsa concerning practical laws in the Shulchan Aruch, section Orach Chaim. This work included his responses to queries from such Torah luminaries as the Gerrer Rebbe. It has been noted for its unique approach to halacha, using non-halakhic and kabbalistic sources to solve halachic problems, and is still widely quoted to this day. Frumer also produced an anonymous pamphlet titled עיקרי דיני תפילה (Main Laws of Prayer), which was widely read in prewar Poland. At the second Siyum HaShas in Yeshivas Chachmei Lublin in June 1938, Frumer initiated the Mishnah Yomit worldwide daily study program, as a complement to the Daf Yomi daily Talmud study program.

== Warsaw Ghetto ==
After the Germans closed down Yeshivas Chachmei Lublin, Frumer fled to Warsaw and moved into the Warsaw Ghetto, where he continued to study Torah and produce chidushim (original Torah insights). He and another Sochatchover Hasid, Rabbi Avremele Weinberg, directed the clandestine education of several hundred Sochatchover yeshiva students in the ghetto under the direction of the third Sochatchover Rebbe, Rabbi Dovid Bornsztain, who was also incarcerated there. As the Nazi deportations increased in frequency, Frumer and his Rebbe joined other Torah scholars who disguised themselves as workers in a large shoe factory owned by Fritz Schulz. Frumer worked in the Wooden and Fur Shoe section, which produced wooden clogs and fur slippers and supplied footwear for the German soldiers on the Russian front. While he worked, he reviewed his Torah studies by heart.

Twelve days after the Warsaw Ghetto Uprising, Frumer and his family were deported with other Jews to the Majdanek concentration camp. Frumer was murdered a few days later, on May 2, 1943 (27 Nisan 5703). It was reported that as he was taken to the gas chamber, he clapped his hands and proclaimed aloud, "Let us sanctify God's Name with joy. Blessed is He who has kept us alive and sustained us to have this great merit".

== Works ==
Frumer's works are:

- Siach HaSadeh (Bush of the Field) (Piotrków, 1913 and republished numerous times thereafter)
- Mekabtzal (Lublin, 1937)
- Responsa Eretz Tzvi (Land of the Deer) (Lublin, 1938 and republished numerous times thereafter)
- Eretz Tzvi - commentary on the Torah (Tel Aviv, 1980)
- Eretz Tzvi - commentary on the Jewish Festivals (Tel Aviv, 1985)
- Yalkut He'Emunah (collection of faith) (Tel Aviv, 1985)
- Eretz Tvi - commentary on the Haggadah (Bnei Brak, 2009)

== Notable Students ==
- Rabbi Yisroel Yitzchok Piekarski
- Rabbi Shlomo Zev Zweigenhaft
