= 1724 =

1724 in various calendars
- Gregorian calendar: 1724; MDCCXXIV
- Ab urbe condita: 2477
- Armenian calendar: 1173; ԹՎ ՌՃՀԳ
- Assyrian calendar: 6474
- Balinese saka calendar: 1645–1646
- Bengali calendar: 1130–1131
- Berber calendar: 2674
- British Regnal year: 10 Geo. 1 – 11 Geo. 1
- Buddhist calendar: 2268
- Burmese calendar: 1086
- Byzantine calendar: 7232–7233
- Chinese calendar: 癸卯年 (Water Rabbit); 4421 or 4214 — to — 甲辰年 (Wood Dragon); 4422 or 4215
- Coptic calendar: 1440–1441
- Discordian calendar: 2890
- Ethiopian calendar: 1716–1717
- Hebrew calendar: 5484–5485
- Hindu calendars
- Vikram Samvat: 1780–1781
- Shaka Samvat: 1645–1646
- Kali Yuga: 4824–4825
- Holocene calendar: 11724
- Igbo calendar: 724–725
- Iranian calendar: 1102–1103
- Islamic calendar: 1136–1137
- Japanese calendar: Kyōhō 9 (享保９年)
- Javanese calendar: 1648–1649
- Julian calendar: Gregorian minus 11 days
- Korean calendar: 4057
- Minguo calendar: 188 before ROC 民前188年
- Nanakshahi calendar: 256
- Thai solar calendar: 2266–2267
- Tibetan calendar: ཆུ་མོ་ཡོས་ལོ་ (female Water-Hare); 1850 or 1469 or 697 — to — ཤིང་ཕོ་འབྲུག་ལོ་ (male Wood-Dragon); 1851 or 1470 or 698

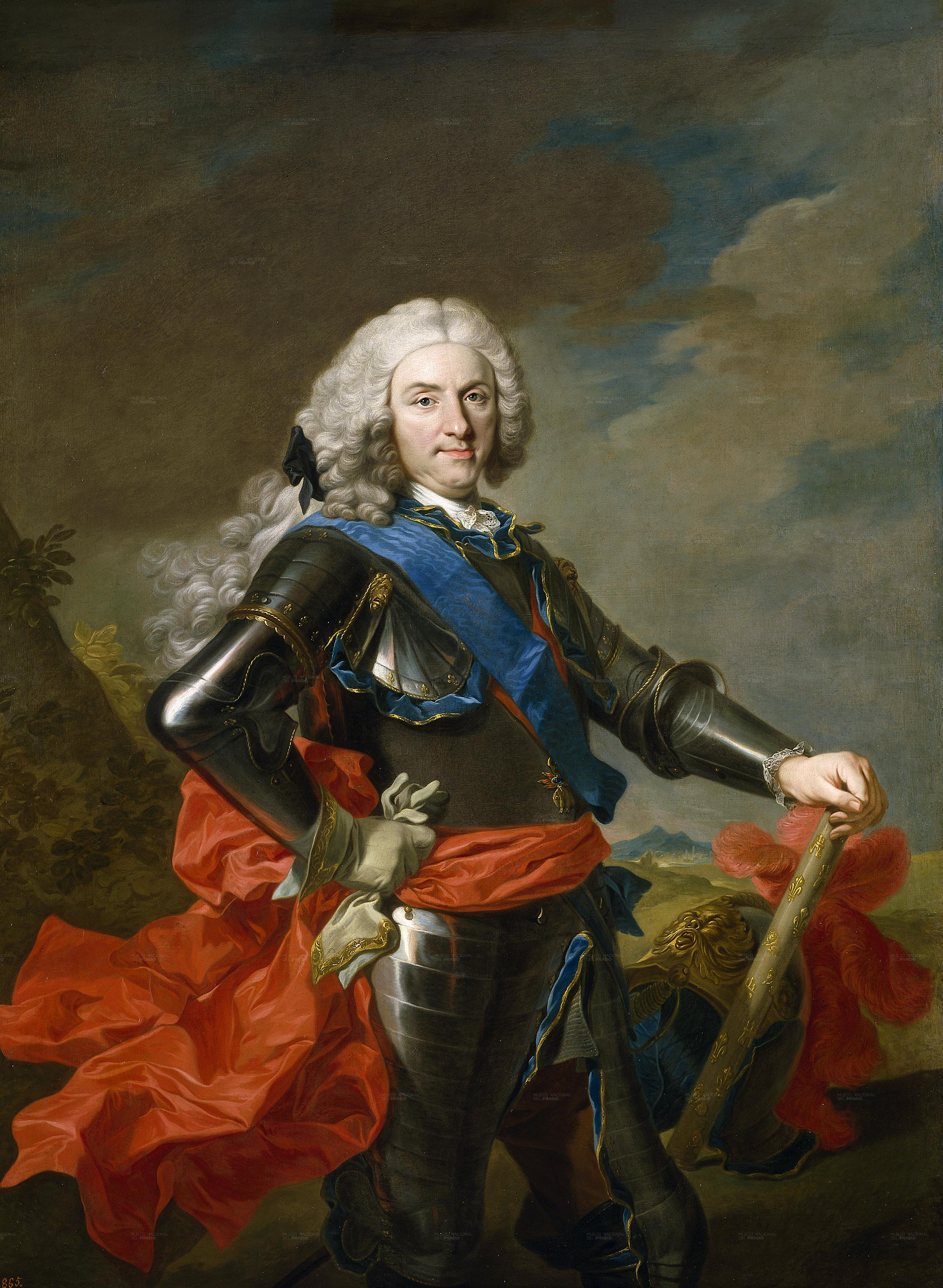
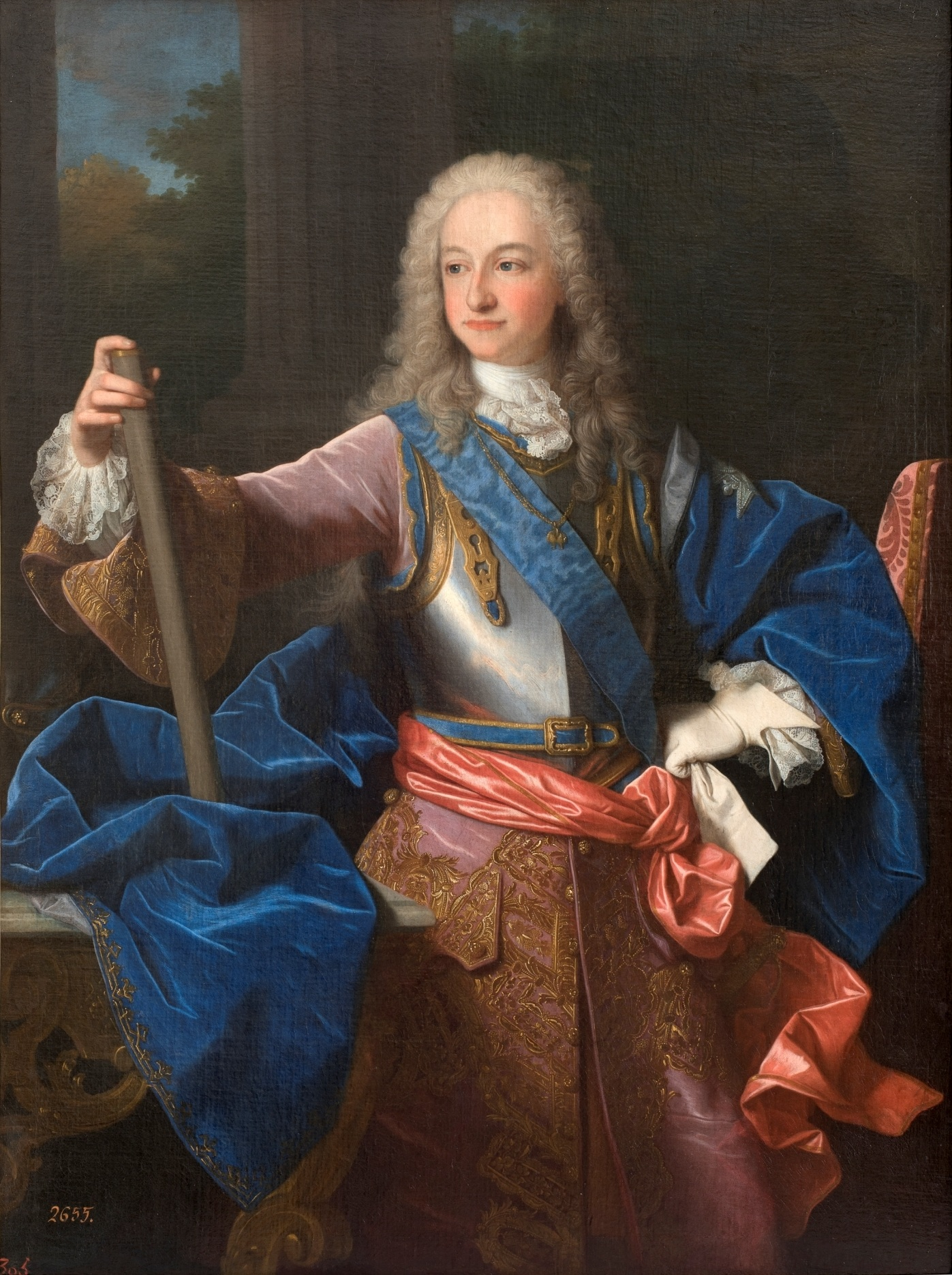
January 15: King Felipe V of Spain abdicates in favor of his son, who becomes King Luis I but dies 7 months later.

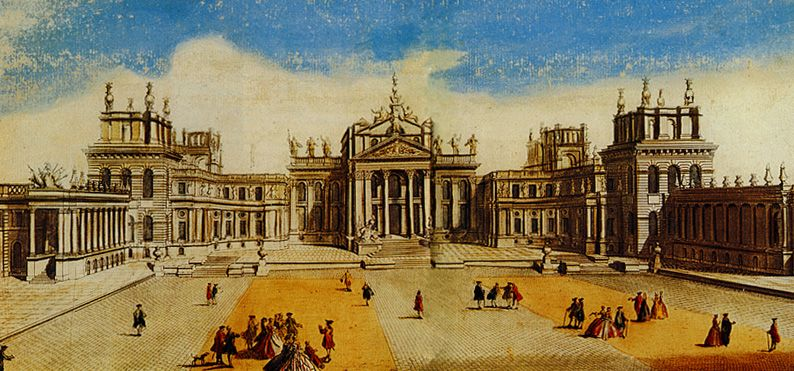
1724: Blenheim Palace is completed.

1724 (MDCCXXIV) was a leap year starting on Saturday of the Gregorian calendar and a leap year starting on Wednesday of the Julian calendar, the 1724th year of the Common Era (CE) and Anno Domini (AD) designations, the 724th year of the 2nd millennium, the 24th year of the 18th century, and the 5th year of the 1720s decade. As of the start of 1724, the Gregorian calendar was 11 days ahead of the Julian calendar, which remained in localized use until 1923.

== Events ==
=== January–March ===
- January 15 – King Philip V of Spain abdicates the throne in favour of his 16-year-old son Louis I.
- January 18 – The Dutch East India Company cargo ship Fortuyn, on its maiden voyage, departs from the Cape of Good Hope in South Africa after a layover of 16 days following its arrival from the Netherlands. With a crew of 225 commanded by Pieter Westrik, the ship departs for Batavia in the Dutch East Indies and is never seen again.
- January 22 – Bruno Mauricio de Zabala, Spanish Captain general of the Río de la Plata, forces the Portuguese to abandon their fortified settlement at what will become the city of Montevideo in Uruguay.
- January 28 – Saint Petersburg State University is established in Russia.
- February 8 – Catherine I of Russia is officially named tsaritsa by her husband, Peter the Great.
- February 20 – The premiere of Giulio Cesare, an Italian opera by George Frideric Handel, takes place in London.
- March 7 – Pope Innocent XIII dies at the age of 68 after less than three years as the Roman Catholic pontiff.
- March 20 – The 1724 papal conclave opens in Rome, 13 days after the death of Innocent XIII. Starting with 33 electors and eventually having 53, the conclave deliberates for more than two months before selecting a successor.

=== April–June ===
- April 7 – (Good Friday) Bach leads the first performance of his St John Passion,""carefully designed with a great deal of musico-theological intent", on Good Friday.
- April 10 – Bach leads the first performance of his cantata Erfreut euch, ihr Herzen, BWV 66, his first cantata composed for Easter in Leipzig.
- April 23 – Johann Sebastian Bach leads the first performance of his cantata Du Hirte Israel, höre, BWV 104, illustrating the topic of the Good Shepherd in pastoral music.
- April 28 – The first of the seven Drapier's Letters, satirical pamphlets seeking to arouse public opinion in Ireland against the imposition by the British of a privately minted copper coinage, is published by Jonathan Swift, Dean of St Patrick's Cathedral, Dublin and author, writing under the pseudonym "M. B., Drapier", identifying himself as a drapier or seller of cloth.
- May 13 – Cardinal Giulio Piazza, the Archbishop of Faenza, comes within four votes of being elected the new Pope
- May 29 – Cardinal Vincenzo Orsini, the Archbishop of Benevento, accepts the papacy, two days after being unanimously selected by the cardinals at the papal conclave in Rome. He becomes the 245th pontiff as Pope Benedict XIII.
- June 11 – Johann Sebastian Bach leads his cantata O Ewigkeit, du Donnerwort (O eternity, you word of thunder), BWV 20, on the first Sunday after Trinity, beginning his second cycle, the chorale cantata cycle.
- June 23 – The Treaty of Constantinople is signed, partitioning Persia between the Ottoman Empire and Russia.
- June 24 – On the Feast of St. John the Baptist, Bach leads the first performance of his Christ unser Herr zum Jordan kam, BWV 7, the third cantata of his chorale cantata cycle.

=== July–September ===
- July 2 – On the Feast of the Visitation, Bach leads the first performance of his Meine Seel erhebt den Herren, BWV 10, the fifth cantata of his chorale cantata cycle.
- July 27 – "Peter the Wild Boy" is captured near Helpensen in Hanover.
- July 31 – The Hyderabad State is created in India, as Mughal Emperor Muhammad Shah rewards his associate Mir Qamar-ud-din Khan. Qamar-ud-din becomes the first Nizam of Hyderabad. The princely state exists for more than 220 years, coming to an end after India's independence from Britain.
- August – Longman, the oldest surviving publishing house in England, is founded in London by Thomas Longman.
- August 13 – Johann Sebastian Bach leads the first performance of Nimm von uns, Herr, du treuer Gott, BWV 101, a chorale cantata on a famous tune.
- August 31 – Louis I of Spain dies of smallpox, aged 17, after a reign of seven months, and his father Philip V resumes the throne.
- September 4 – José de Grimaldo, who had been Prime Minister for Spain's King Philip V until the latter's abdication in January, resumes office with the return of King Philip.
- September 10 – Johann Sebastian Bach leads the first performance of Jesu, der du meine Seele, BWV 78, a chorale cantata based on a passion hymn by Johann Rist.
- September 24 – The Paris Bourse, the stock exchange for France, is created by order of King Louis XV on the advice of Nicolas Ravot d'Ombreval, four years after a financial panic had shut down trading. Stock markets had already been set up in Lyon, Bourdeaux and Toulouse.
- September 29 – J. S. Bach leads the first performance of Herr Gott, dich loben alle wir, BWV 130, for the feast of archangel Michael, based on Paul Eber's hymn in twelve stanzas.

=== October–December ===
- October 2 – Muhammad bin Nasir is elected as the new Imam of Oman after the overthrow of his brother, Saif bin Sultan II.
- October 15 – The historic Teatro Nuovo opera house is inaugurated in Naples with the premiere of Antonio Orefice's comic opera Lo Simmele.
- October 16 – Yeongjo becomes the new emperor of Korea after the death of his older brother Gyeongjong. He reigns for almost 52 years until his death on April 22, 1776.
- October 22 – J. S. Bach leads the first performance of Schmücke dich, o liebe Seele (Adorn yourself, O dear soul) in Leipzig on the 20th Sunday after Trinity, based on the communion hymn of the same name.
- October 31 – George Frideric Handel's opera Tamerlano is performed for the first time, premiering in London. The opera will be revived as late as 2009.
- November 11 – Joseph Blake (alias "Blueskin"), English highwayman, is hanged in London.
- November 16
  - Highwayman Jack Sheppard is hanged in London.
  - Willem Mons, lover of Catherine I of Russia, is executed, and his head preserved in alcohol.
- November 19 – The Dutch East India Company frigate Slot ter Hooge strikes rocks and sinks off Porto Santo Island, Madeira, with the loss of 221 of the 254 people on board.
- December 2 – The Metropolitan Mojsije Petrović, leader of the Serbian Orthodox Church within the Habsburg monarchy, issues a 57-point decree to purge the church of the Turkish influence.
- December 7
  - In the aftermath of an attack against Jesuit Catholics led by the Lutheran mayor of the Prussian city of Thorn (modern-day Toruń, Poland), ten Lutheran officials (including mayor Johann Gottfried Rösner) are executed in the town square. Rösner and seven others are decapitated by an axe, while two others are hanged, drawn and quartered for blasphemy.
  - By order of the Nizam, Hyderabad is made the permanent capital of the Indian princely state of the same name. It becomes capital of the Indian states of Telangana and Andhra Pradesh
- December 14 – The Viceroyalty of Zhili (modern-day Hebei province) is recreated in the Chinese Empire by the Emperor Yongzheng for the first time in 55 years, with Li Weijun as the first Viceory. Zhili exists as a viceroyalty until the fall of the Qing dynasty in 1912.
- December 24 – Francesco Valesio resumes writing his Diario di Roma, 13 years after he ceased his recording of daily life in Rome.
- December 25 – J. S. Bach leads the first performance of Gelobet seist du, Jesu Christ, BWV 91, in Leipzig, based on Luther's 1524 Christmas hymn.

=== Date unknown ===
- China expels foreign missionaries.
- Blenheim Palace construction is completed in England. It is presented as a gift from the nation to the Duke of Marlborough, for his involvement in the Battle of Blenheim in 1704.
- The Austrian Netherlands agree to the Pragmatic Sanction.
- Shah Mahmud Hotaki of Afghanistan goes insane.
- The Kaitokudō academy merchant school, part predecessor of Osaka University is founded in Japan.

== Births ==
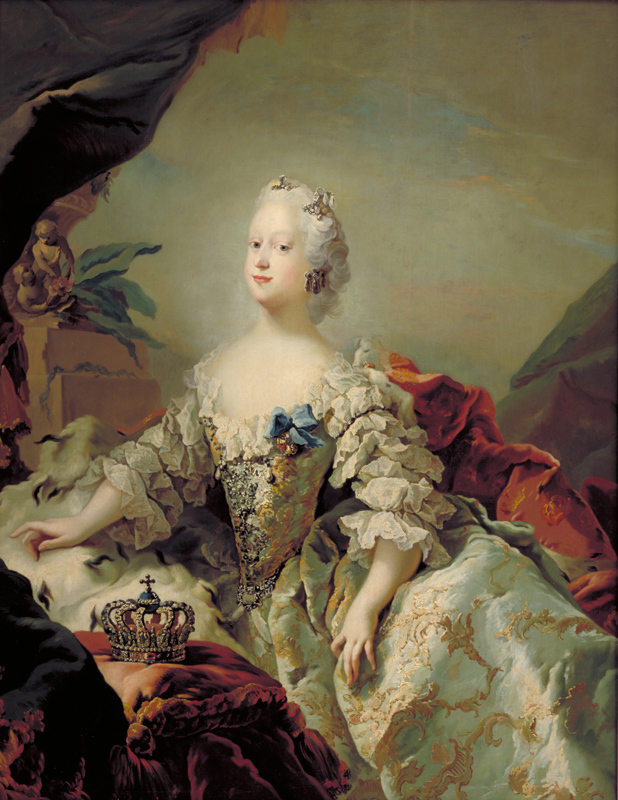
Louise of Great Britain

- January 12 – Frances Brooke, English writer (d. 1789)
- February 16 – Christopher Gadsden, American statesman (d. 1805)
- February 28 – George Townshend, 1st Marquess Townshend, British field marshal (d. 1807)
- February 29 – Eva Marie Veigel, Austrian-born English ballet dancer, known as La Violette (d. 1822)
- March 1 – Manuel do Cenáculo, Portuguese prelate and antiquarian (d. 1814)
- March 6 – Henry Laurens, political leader during the American Revolutionary War, father of John Laurens (d. 1792)
- March 27 – Jane Colden, American botanist (d. 1766)
- April 12 – Lyman Hall, American signer of the Declaration of Independence (d. 1790)
- April 22 – Immanuel Kant, German philosopher (d. 1804)
- May 7 – Dagobert Sigmund von Wurmser, Alsatian-born Austrian general (d. 1797)
- May 19 – Augustus Hervey, 3rd Earl of Bristol, British admiral, politician (d. 1779)
- June 8 – John Smeaton, English civil engineer (d. 1792)
- June 15 – Countess Palatine Maria Franziska of Sulzbach, German aristocrat (d. 1794)
- July 2 – Friedrich Gottlieb Klopstock, German poet (d. 1803)
- July 10 – Eva Ekeblad, Swedish scientist (d. 1786)
- August 3 – Alvise Foscari, Venetian admiral (d. 1790)
- August 23 – Abraham Yates, American Continental Congressman (d. 1796)
- August 25 – George Stubbs, English painter (d. 1806)
- August 27 – John Joachim Zubly, Swiss-born Continental Congressman (d. 1781)
- September 3 – Guy Carleton, 1st Baron Dorchester, British soldier and Governor of Quebec (d. 1808)
- December 12 – Samuel Hood, 1st Viscount Hood, British admiral (d. 1816)
- December 13 – Franz Aepinus, German scientist (d. 1802)
- December 18 – Louise of Great Britain, queen of Frederick V of Denmark (d. 1751)
- December 24 – Johann Conrad Ammann, Swiss physician, naturalist (d. 1811)
- December 25 – John Michell, English scientist and geologist (d. 1793)
- December 28 – Christoph Franz von Buseck, Prince-Bishop of Bamberg (d. 1805)
- December 30 – Louis-Jean-François Lagrenée, French painter (d. 1805)
- Date unknown
  - Marie Anne Victoire Pigeon, French mathematician (d. 1767)
  - James MacLaine, Irish highwayman (d. 1750)

== Deaths ==
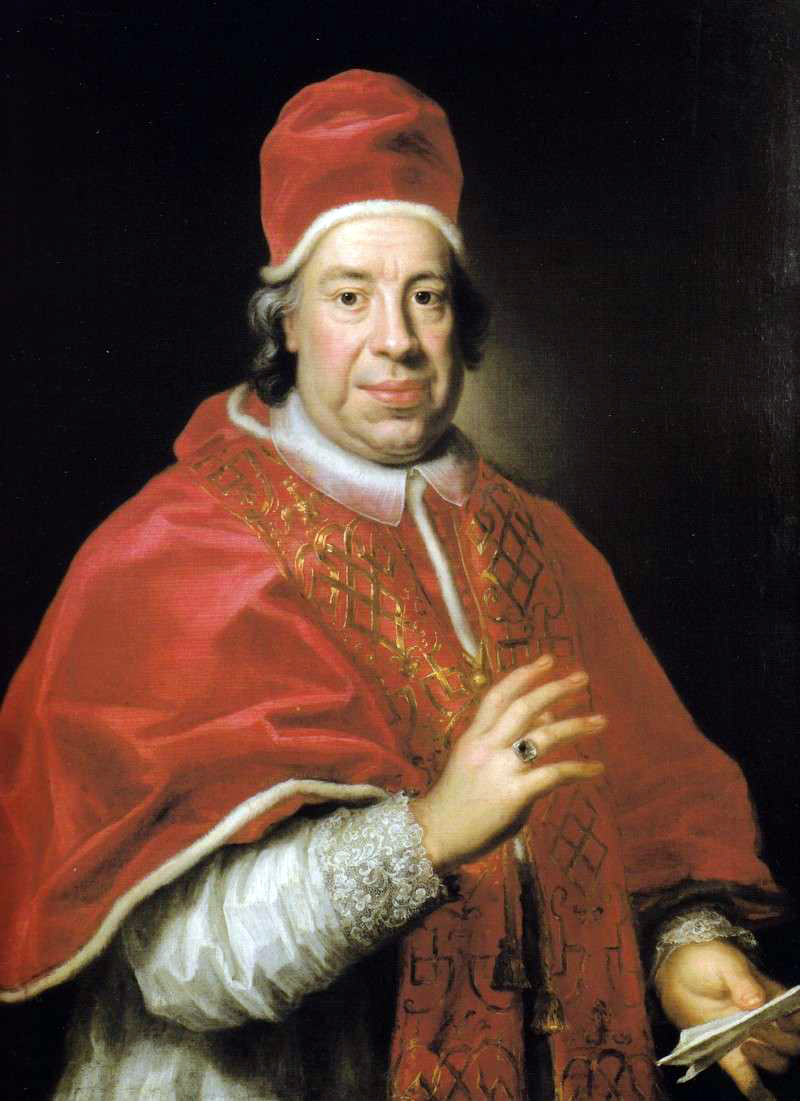
Pope Innocent XIII

Saint Ludovico Sabbatini

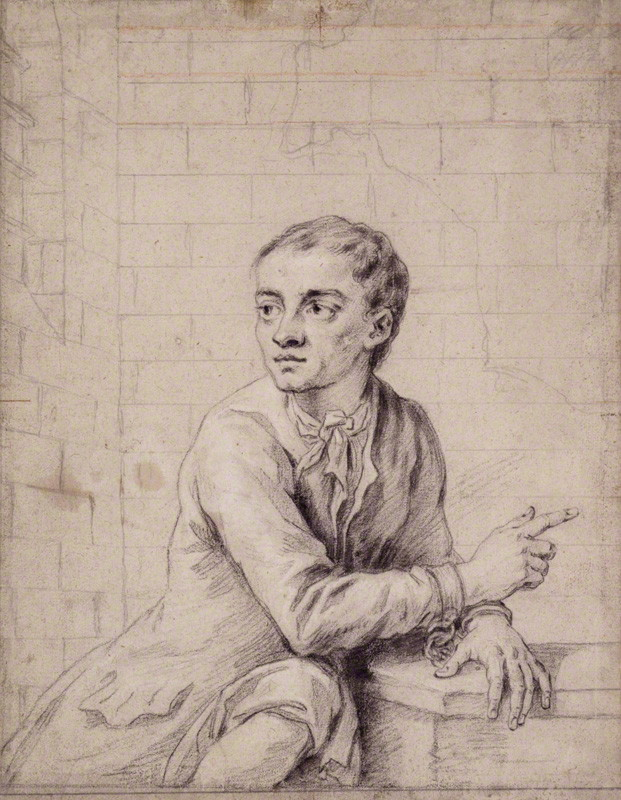
Jack Sheppard

- January 20 – William Lowndes, English politician (b. 1652)
- February 19 – Pieter Schuyler, British colonial military leader, acting governor of New York (b. 1657)
- March 4 – Princess Eleonore Juliane of Brandenburg-Ansbach, duchess by marriage of Württemberg-Winnental (b. 1663)
- March 7 – Pope Innocent XIII (b. 1655)
- March 10 – Urban Hjärne, Swedish chemist (b. 1641)
- March 15 – Regent Marie Jeanne Baptiste of Savoy-Nemours (b. 1644)
- March 19 – Lewis Watson, 1st Earl of Rockingham, English politician (b. 1655)
- March 31 – Sophia of Saxe-Weissenfels, Princess of Anhalt-Zerbst (b. 1654)
- April 28 – Streynsham Master, English colonial administrator (b. 1640)
- May 3 – John Leverett the Younger, American President of Harvard (b. 1662)
- May 21 – Robert Harley, 1st Earl of Oxford and Earl Mortimer, English statesman (b. 1661)
- June – Magdelaine Chapelain, French fortune teller and poisoner (b. 1651)
- June 11 – Ludovico Sabbatini, Italian Roman Catholic priest and saint (b. 1650)
- June 15 – Henry Sacheverell, English churchman and politician (b. 1674)
- June 24 – Johann Theile, German composer and organist (b. 1646)
- July 1 – Johann Homann, German cartographer (b. 1664)
- July 2 – Thomas Maule, prominent Quaker in colonial Salem (b. 1645)
- July 13 – Sir Richard Levinge, 1st Baronet, British politician (b. 1656)
- July 31 – Claude de Ramezay, Canadian politician (b. 1659)
- August 2 – Patrick Hume, 1st Earl of Marchmont, Scottish statesman (b. 1641)
- August 6 – Samson Wertheimer, European rabbi (b. 1658)
- August 21 – Noël Alexandre, French theologian and ecclesiastical historian (b. 1639)
- August 24 – Andreas Kneller, German organist and composer (b. 1649)
- August 31 – King Louis I of Spain (b. 1707)
- October 2 – François-Timoléon de Choisy, French writer (b. 1644)
- October 18 – Jean de Hautefeuille, French cleric, scientist (b. 1647)
- October 29 – William Wollaston, English philosophical writer (b. 1659)
- October 30 – Marie of Lorraine, French princess (b. 1674)
- November 7 – John Kyrle, British philanthropist (b. 1637)
- November 14 – John Murray, 1st Duke of Atholl (b. 1660)
- November 16 – Jack Sheppard, British criminal (executed) (b. 1702)
- November 18 – Bartolomeu de Gusmão, Portuguese naturalist (b. 1685)
- November 24 – Ernst Ludwig I, Duke of Saxe-Meiningen (b. 1672)
- November 28 – Robert Marsham, 1st Baron Romney, British politician (b. 1685)
- December 27 – Thomas Guy, English philanthropist (b. 1644)
