= Brigitte Felsch-Reiff =

German painter and graphic artist

Brigitte Felsch-Reiff (born Brigitte Reiff, 22 September 1925, in Weißenfels/Saale Germany, died 25 December 2015 in Halle an der Saale Germany) was a German painter and graphic artist. She created a comprehensive oeuvre of oil paintings and mixed media. She also produced a large number of lithographic prints and prints from wood cuts.

The themes of her paintings and graphic oeuvre are landscapes and still lives, as well as portraits and people. She also produced a series of religious works during the 1950s, mainly prints from wood cuts.

After completing school shortly after the start of World War II, she completed a combined housekeeping and tailor apprenticeship. In addition, she joined a painting circle in the theatre of her hometown Weißenfels, which influenced her to become an artist.

Short after the end of the war, she applied to the art school Burg Giebichenstein in Halle an der Saale for the subject of painting and graphics. She was accepted and enrolled in 1947 as a student. She joined the class of the teacher Professor Charles Crodel.

Felsch-Reiff was one of the very few women who were students in the class of Professor Charles Crodel at the art school Burg Giebichenstein Halle. This is where she met Heinz Felsch, her fellow student. They married in 1949 and had a son and two daughters.

From this time on, the couple's professional lives were closely linked and they both worked on larger scale commissions of architectural art from the mid-1960s to the late 1970s. These were mainly mosaic wall friezes in lobbies of newly built hospitals and schools. There are still two of what were previously three larger wall mosaics in the lift lobbies of the Policlinic Reil in Halle. A further 17-meter long wall mosaic frieze can still be seen in a school in Braunsbedra near Halle.

Felsch-Reiff regularly spent the summer months during the late 1940s until the mid-1950s with her husband in Ahrenshoop, a little fishing village on the Baltic Sea, known for its artist community. A number of paintings, drawings and lithographic prints originate from this time and reflect the partly rough but also gentle landscapes between the sea with its dunes, cliffs and the Bodden laguna.

In 1954, she created a series of lithographic prints about the Christmas story. She stepped into the public eye for the first time with her graphic work at the ‘Frankfurter Evangelischer Kirchentag’ (Frankfurt Protestant Church Day) in 1956. In the same year she was also represented with a series of woodcuts for passion time at the exhibition of Christian Artists in Weimar.

Felsch-Reiff became part of the group of painters known as the “Hallesche Schule” (school of Halle). It was a movement of modern painting during a period from 1945 until the late 1950s under the influence of the professors of Fine Art Charles Crodel and Erwin Hahs. The term “Hallesche Schule” describes a specific regional movement rooted in classic modern art.

In the late 1970s, when their commercial work became less plentiful, she and her husband, Heinz Felsch, started to produce their own range of small ceramic medallions and ceramic jewellery, which helped to support them financially.

Felsch-Reiff carried on painting right up into her 80s.

In 1954, Felsch-Reiff became a member of the ‘Verband Bildender Künstler der DDR’ (National Association of fine Arts of the GDR).

== Literatur ==
- Felsch-Reif, Brigitte. In: Dietmar Eisold (Hrsg.): Lexikon Künstler der DDR. Verlag Neues Leben, Berlin, 2010, S. 198
