= Friedrich Johannes Frommann =

German publisher, bookseller and politician

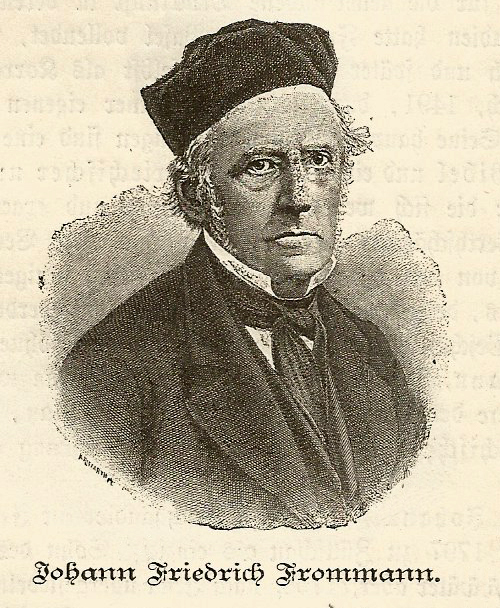
Friedrich Johannes Frommann (artist and date unknown)

Friedrich Johannes Frommann (9 August 1797, Züllichau - 6 June 1886, Jena) was a German publisher, bookseller and politician.

== Biography ==
His father was the bookseller and publisher, Carl Friedrich Ernst Frommann. He attended secondary school in Gotha and served an apprenticeship as a typesetter there. From 1816 to 1817, he attended lectures in history at the University of Jena, and was one of the participants of the Wartburg Festival in Eisenach, about which he later wrote a chronicle. After that, he continued his apprenticeship as a printer and studied in Berlin. There, in 1818, he became one of the founders of the local Burschenschaft (fraternity).

From 1818 to 1820, he was in Hamburg, where he became a member of the Hamburg Turnerschaft, an athletic society, and was active as a gymnast. From 1819 to 1820, he was the society's Gymnastics Supervisor.

In 1823, his father took him into the publishing business and he officially became a partner in 1825. After his father's retirement in 1830, he took over the company. Most of the works he published were by Professors at the University of Jena.

He was a co-founder, and several times served as president, of the Börsenverein der Deutschen Buchhändler (Stock Exchange Association of German Booksellers). In 1852, he a founding member and first Treasurer of the Verein für Thüringische Geschichte (Association for Thuringian History). From 1853 to 1855, he represented the constituency of Apolda in the Landtag von Sachsen-Weimar-Eisenach, and represented Jena there from 1859 to 1861. He was also a member of the Jena City Council for many years. In 1875, the city of Jena made him an Honorary Citizen and the University awarded him an Honorary Doctorate.

Shortly after his death, his company moved from Jena to Stuttgart. It still exists there today, doing business under the name Frommann-Holzboog Verlag.
