= 1811 =

1811 in various calendars
- Gregorian calendar: 1811; MDCCCXI
- Ab urbe condita: 2564
- Armenian calendar: 1260; ԹՎ ՌՄԿ
- Assyrian calendar: 6561
- Balinese saka calendar: 1732–1733
- Bengali calendar: 1217–1218
- Berber calendar: 2761
- British Regnal year: 51 Geo. 3 – 52 Geo. 3
- Buddhist calendar: 2355
- Burmese calendar: 1173
- Byzantine calendar: 7319–7320
- Chinese calendar: 庚午年 (Metal Horse); 4508 or 4301 — to — 辛未年 (Metal Goat); 4509 or 4302
- Coptic calendar: 1527–1528
- Discordian calendar: 2977
- Ethiopian calendar: 1803–1804
- Hebrew calendar: 5571–5572
- Hindu calendars
- Vikram Samvat: 1867–1868
- Shaka Samvat: 1732–1733
- Kali Yuga: 4911–4912
- Holocene calendar: 11811
- Igbo calendar: 811–812
- Iranian calendar: 1189–1190
- Islamic calendar: 1225–1226
- Japanese calendar: Bunka 8 (文化８年)
- Javanese calendar: 1737–1738
- Julian calendar: Gregorian minus 12 days
- Korean calendar: 4144
- Minguo calendar: 101 before ROC 民前101年
- Nanakshahi calendar: 343
- Thai solar calendar: 2353–2354
- Tibetan calendar: ལྕགས་ཕོ་རྟ་ལོ་ (male Iron-Horse); 1937 or 1556 or 784 — to — ལྕགས་མོ་ལུག་ལོ་ (female Iron-Sheep); 1938 or 1557 or 785

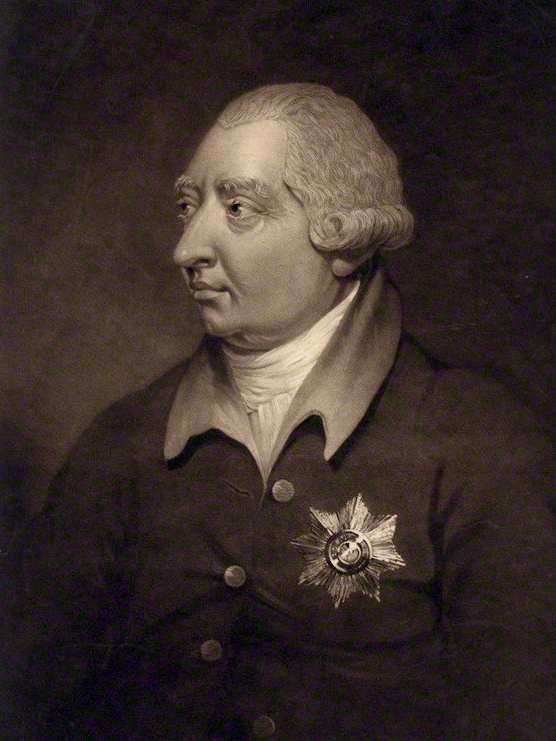
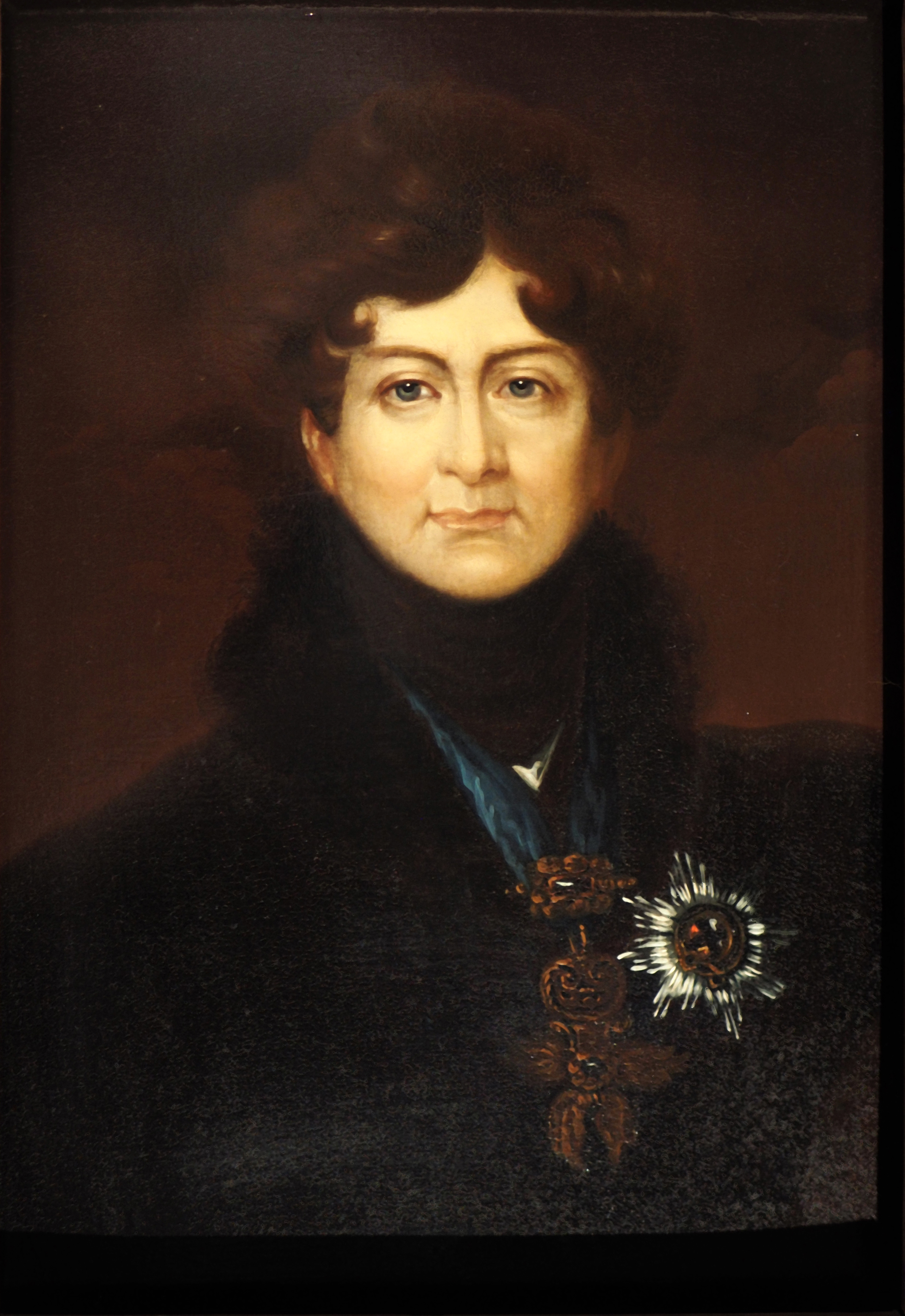
February 5: King George III relieved of duty because of insanity, George, Prince of Wales becomes regent for the United Kingdom.

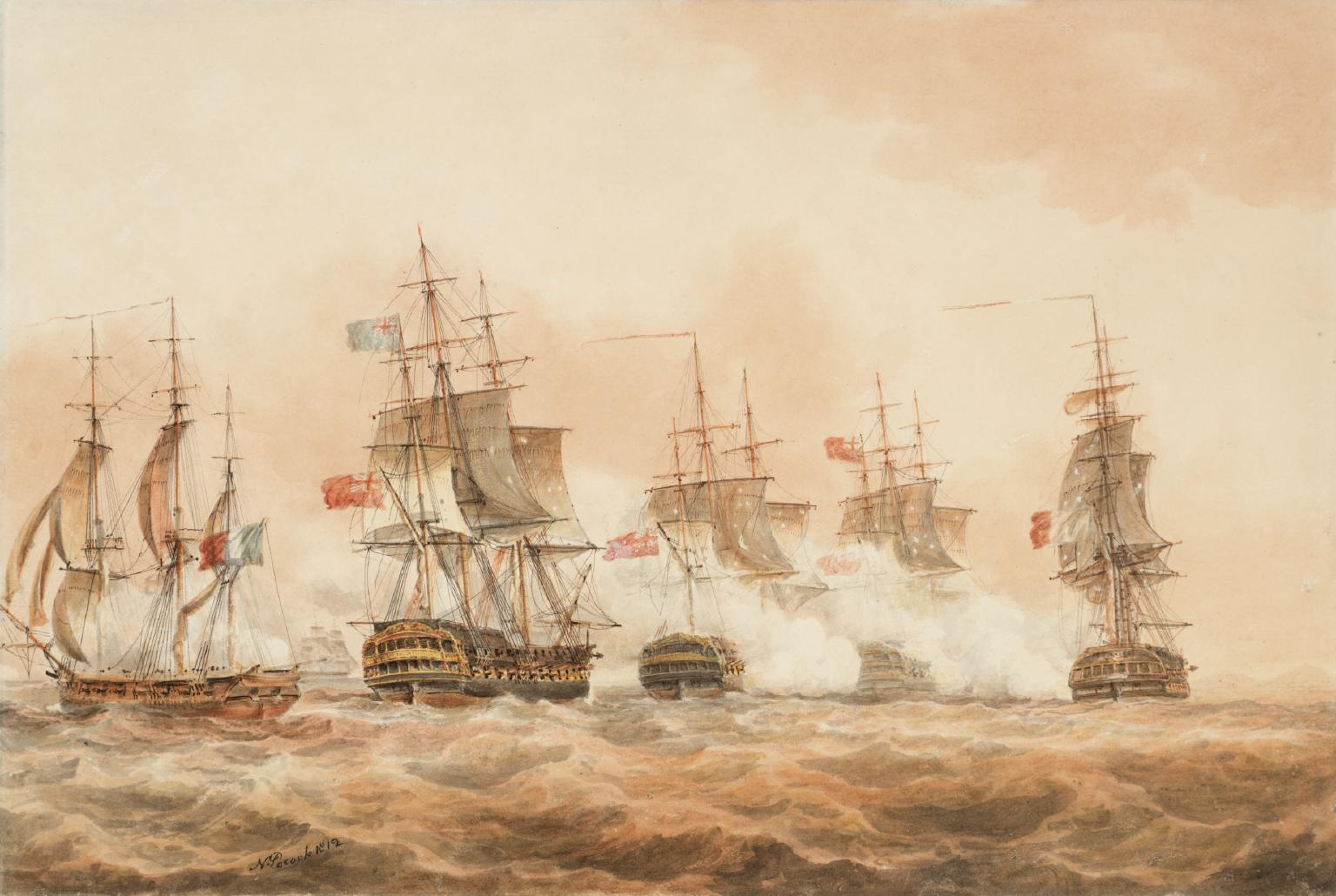
March 13: Battle of Lissa

1811 (MDCCCXI) was a common year starting on Tuesday of the Gregorian calendar and a common year starting on Sunday of the Julian calendar, the 1811th year of the Common Era (CE) and Anno Domini (AD) designations, the 811th year of the 2nd millennium, the 11th year of the 19th century, and the 2nd year of the 1810s decade. As of the start of 1811, the Gregorian calendar was 12 days ahead of the Julian calendar, which remained in localized use until 1923.

== Events ==
=== January–March ===
- January 8 – An unsuccessful slave revolt is led by Charles Deslondes, in St. Charles and St. James Parishes, Louisiana.
- January 17 – Mexican War of Independence – Battle of Calderón Bridge: A heavily outnumbered Spanish force of 6,000 troops defeats nearly 100,000 Mexican revolutionaries.
- January 22 – The Casas Revolt begins in San Antonio, Spanish Texas.
- January 26 – First Siege of Badajoz: French troops (17,000 men) under Marshal Jean-de-Dieu Soult begin the siege at the fortress of Badajoz.
- February 5 – British Regency: George, Prince of Wales becomes prince regent, because of the perceived insanity of his father, King George III of the United Kingdom.
- February 19 – Peninsular War – Battle of the Gebora: An outnumbered French force under Édouard Mortier routs and nearly destroys the Spanish, near Badajoz, Spain.
- March 1 – Citadel Massacre in Cairo: Egyptian ruler Muhammad Ali kills the last Mamluk leaders.
- March 5 – Peninsular War – Battle of Barrosa: A French attack fails, on a larger Anglo-Portuguese-Spanish force attempting to lift the Siege of Cádiz in Spain.
- March 13 – Battle of Lissa: The British fleet defeats the French.
- March 22 – The Commissioners' Plan for Manhattan is presented.
- March 25 – The Great Comet of 1811 is discovered by Honoré Flaugergues.
- March 27 – Battle of Anholt: The British Navy defeats Denmark.
- March 28 – Henri Christophe is proclaimed King Henri I, turning the northern State of Haiti into the Kingdom of Haiti.

=== April–June ===
- April 5–6 – Revolutionary riots occur in Buenos Aires.
- May 3–5 – Peninsular War – Battle of Fuentes de Oñoro: An Anglo-Portuguese Army under General Arthur Wellington defeats the French forces under Marshal André Masséna.
- May 14 – Paraguay declares independence from the Spanish Empire (recognised May 15).
- May 16 – Peninsular War – Battle of Albuera: Spain, Portugal, and Great Britain defeat the French.
- May 18 – Battle of Las Piedras near Las Piedras, Banda Oriental: The independentists of Uruguay gain their first victory.
- June 10 – A volcanic eruption briefly creates Sabrina Island (Azores).
- June 15 – The Klågerup riots erupt in Sweden.
- June 19 – The Carlton House Fête is held at the Prince Regent's London residence Carlton House to celebrate the establishment of the Regency era.

=== July–September ===
- July 5 – Venezuela declares its Independence from the Spanish Empire.
- July 9 – The Great Podil fire breaks out in Kiev, Ukraine.
- July 9 – British explorer David Thompson posts a notice at the confluence of the Columbia and Snake Rivers (in modern-day Washington), claiming the area for the United Kingdom.
- July 11 – The Russian Empire removes Anton II, Catholicos-Patriarch of All Georgia, from his office, placing a Russian-appointed bishop at the head of the Georgian church.
- July 14
  - Italian scientist Amedeo Avogadro publishes his memoir about the molecular content of gases.
  - David Thompson reaches the mouth of the Columbia River, finding Fort Astoria under construction.
- July 26 – Forest fires break out in the Tyrol region of Switzerland, reportedly destroying 64 villages and hamlets.
- July 30 – Mexican War of Independence: Priest and military leader Miguel Hidalgo y Costilla is executed as a rebel, by the Spanish government of New Spain.
- August 3 – Jungfrau, the third highest summit in the Bernese Alps, is first ascended.
- September – Nathan of Breslov leads the first annual Rosh Hashana kibbutz (pilgrimage) of Breslov Hasidim, to the grave of Rabbi Nachman of Breslov in Uman, Ukraine.

=== October–December ===
- October 11 – Inventor John Stevens' boat, the Juliana, begins operation as the first steam-powered ferry service, between New York City and Hoboken, New Jersey.
- October 17 – The silver deposits of Agua Amarga in Chile are discovered becoming, in the following years, instrumental for the Patriots to finance the Chilean War of Independence.
- October 23 – José Gervasio Artigas and 16,000 orientales leave the Banda Oriental del Uruguay, to go into exile.
- October 26 – The Argentine Government declares freedom of expression for the press.
- November 4 – Luddite uprisings, in which workers destroy industrial machines, begin in northern England and the Midlands. According to one historian, "The first attack on textile machines by men who used the name 'General Ludd' and called themselves his followers, was on the night of 4th November 1811 in the village of Bulwell, four miles north of Nottingham, when a small band of men gathered in the darkness and marched to the home of a master weaver called Hollingsworth," then destroyed six of his weaving machines.
- November 7 – Battle of Tippecanoe: American troops led by William Henry Harrison defeat the Native American spiritual leader Tenskwatawa, also known as The Prophet (Chief Tecumseh's brother).
- November 17 – José Miguel Carrera, Chilean founding father, is sworn in as President of the executive Junta of the government of Chile.
- December 2 – Reverend Samuel Marsden sends the first commercial shipment of wool from New South Wales to England.
- December 16 – The New Madrid earthquake in the Mississippi Valley, near New Madrid, reverses the course of the river for a while. Other earthquakes along the fault occur on January 23, 1812 and February 7, 1812.
- December 21 – The first Constitution of the Republic of Venezuela, after it declares its independence from Spain, goes into effect.
- December 26 – The Richmond Theatre fire in Virginia kills 72 people, including the Governor of Virginia George William Smith and the president of the First National Bank of Virginia, Abraham B. Venable.

=== Date unknown ===
- The Red River Colony is founded in Manitoba, Canada.
- Iodine was discovered by French chemist Bernard Courtois.
- The first novel by Jane Austen, Sense and Sensibility, was published.

== Births ==
=== January–June ===
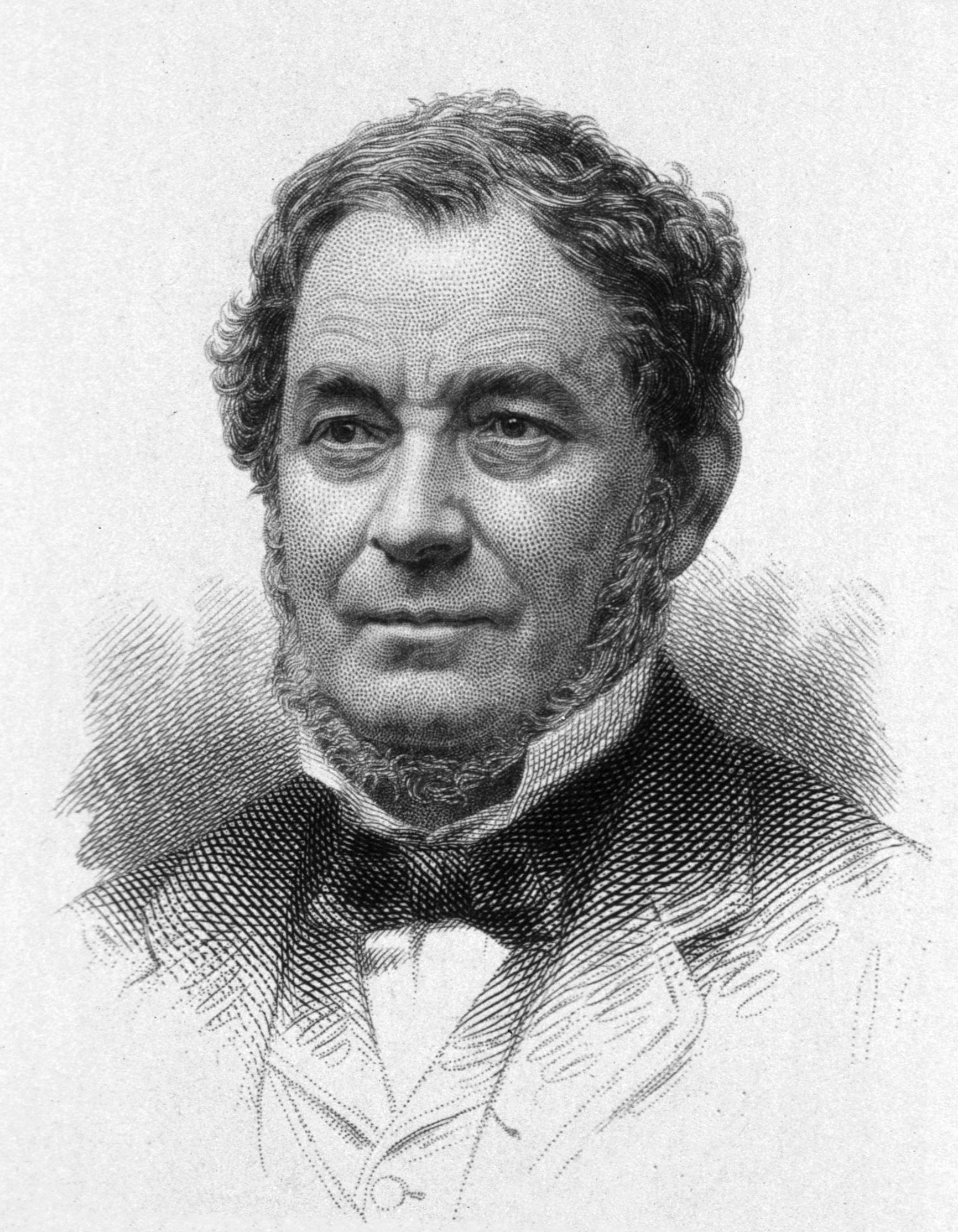
Robert Bunsen

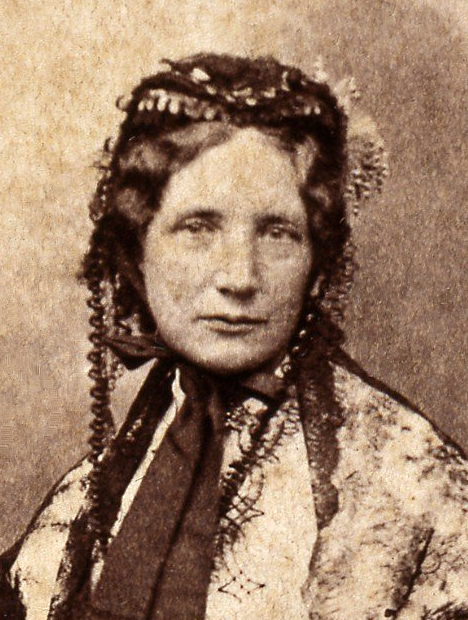
Harriet Beecher Stowe

- January 6 – Charles Sumner, American senator, civil rights activist (d. 1874)
- January 9 – Gilbert Abbott à Beckett, English writer (d. 1856)
- January 27 – Ernst Dieffenbach, German scientist (d. 1855)
- February 1 – Arthur Hallam, English poet (d. 1833)
- February 3 – Horace Greeley, American journalist, editor, and publisher (d. 1872)
- February 6 – Henry George Liddell, English clergyman (d. 1898)
- February 13 – François Achille Bazaine, French general (d. 1888)
- February 15 – Domingo Faustino Sarmiento, Argentinian politician, writer and father of education (d. 1888)
- February 16 – Béla Wenckheim, 8th Prime Minister of Hungary (d. 1879)
- March 20
  - Napoleon II of France (d. 1832)
  - Alfred Domett, 4th Premier of New Zealand (d. 1887)
- March 30 or March 31 – Robert Bunsen, German chemist, inventor (d. 1899)
- May 5 – Francisco Robles, 6th President of Ecuador (d. 1893)
- May 11
  - Chang and Eng Bunker, Siamese twins and sideshow performers (d. 1874)
  - Jean-Jacques Challet-Venel, member of the Swiss Federal Council (d. 1893)
- May 20 – Alfred Domett, 4th Prime Minister of New Zealand (d. 1887)
- June 3 – Henry James, Sr., American theologian (d. 1882)
- June 8 – Carl Johan Thyselius, 3rd Prime Minister of Sweden (d. 1891)
- June 14 – Harriet Beecher Stowe, American author, abolitionist (d. 1896)
- June 17 – Jón Sigurðsson, leader of the 19th century Icelandic independence movement (d. 1879)
- June 21 – Matthew Simpson, American Methodist bishop and academic (d. 1884)
- June 24 – John Archibald Campbell, Associate Justice of the Supreme Court of the United States (d. 1889)

=== July–December ===
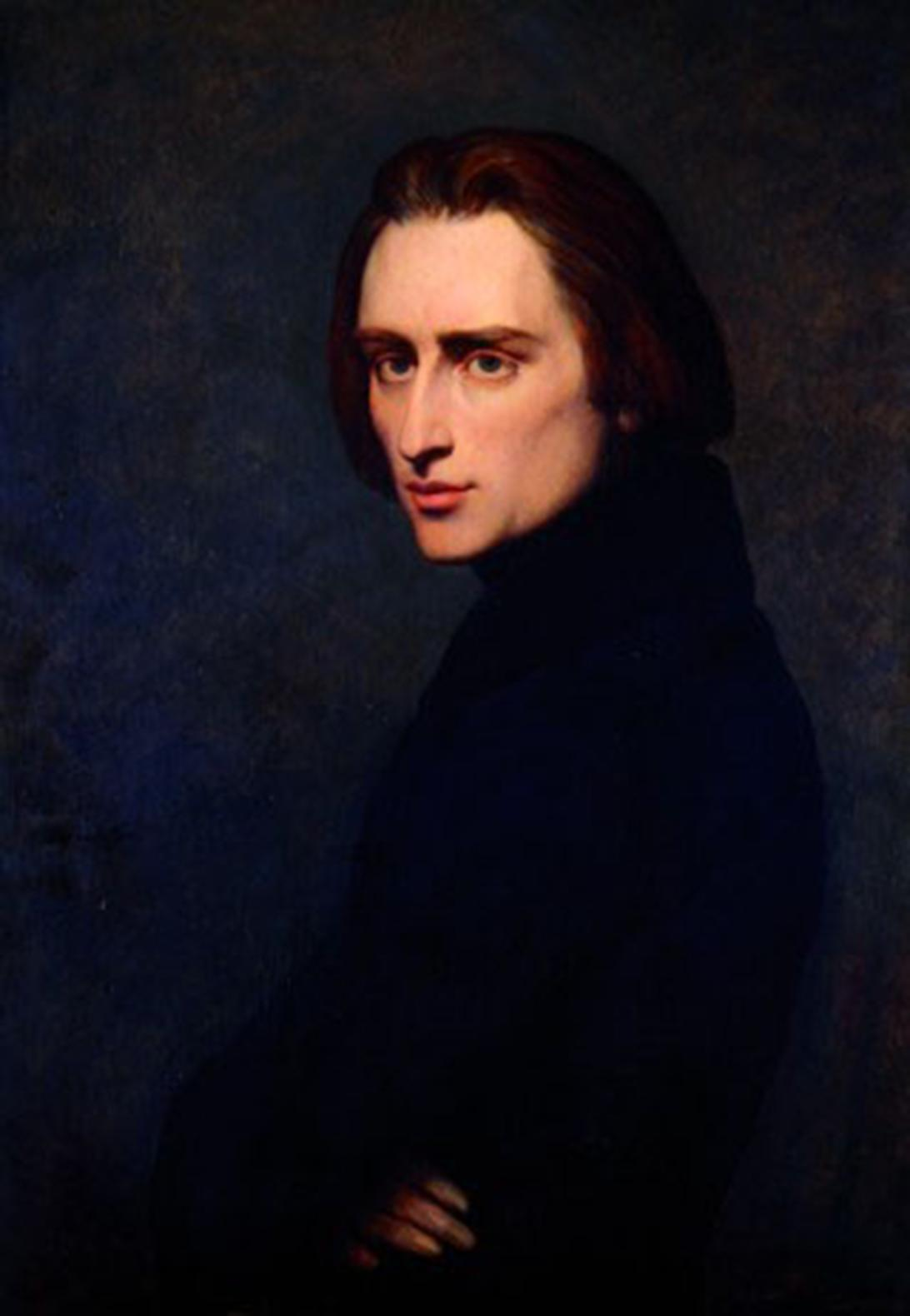
Franz Liszt

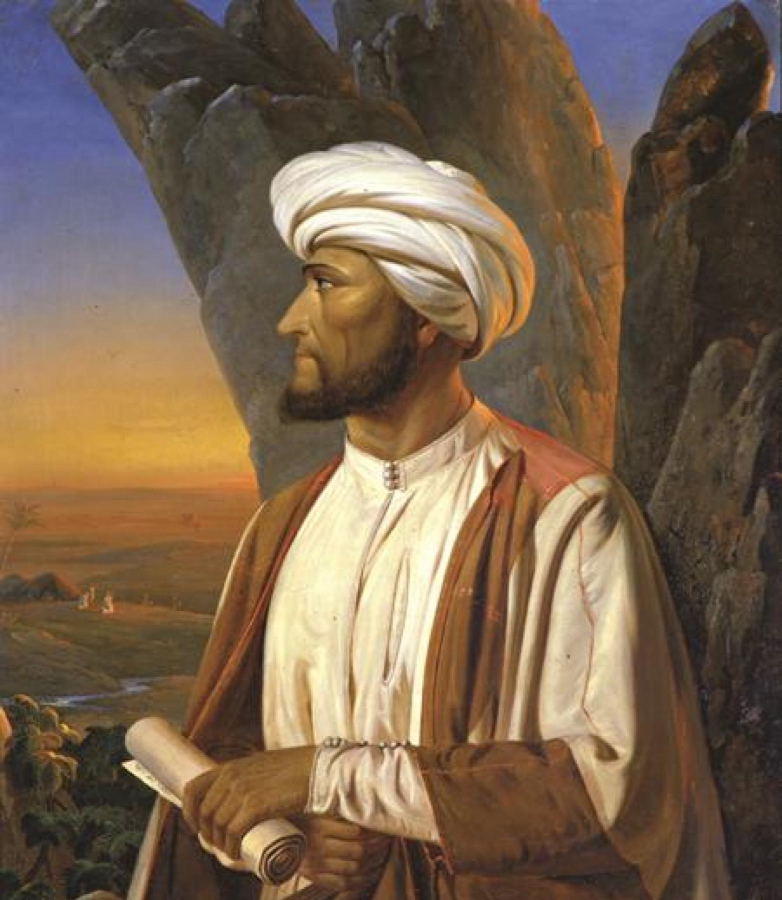
Georg August Wallin

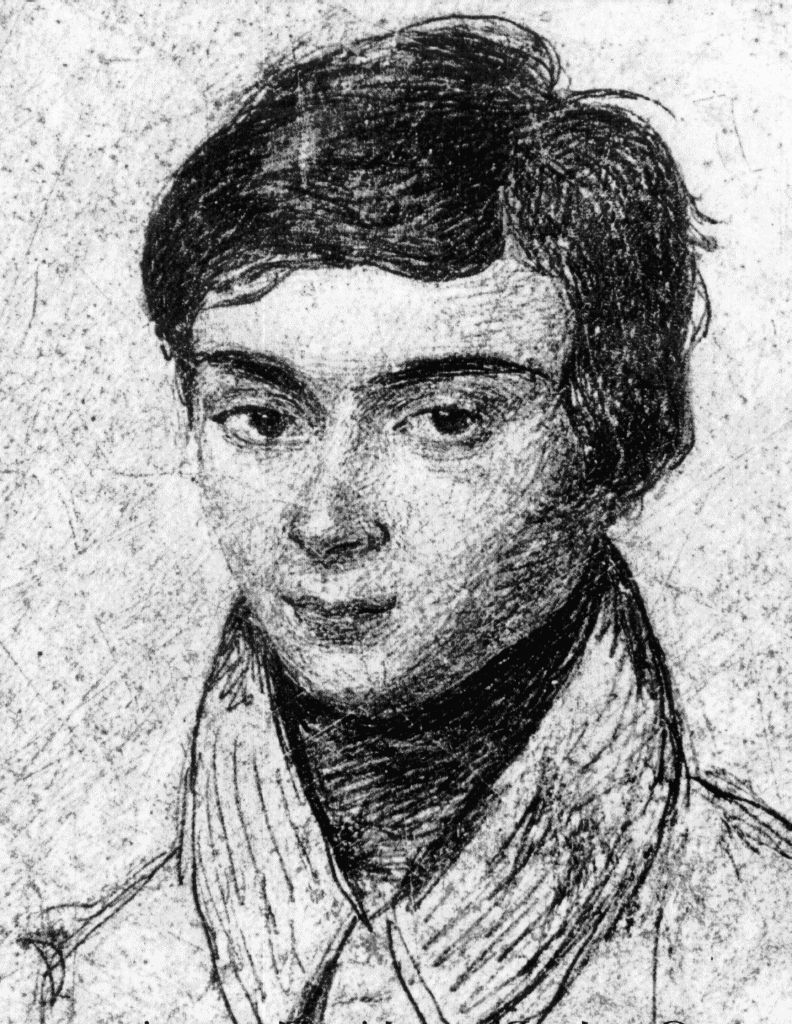
Évariste Galois

- July 11
  - Isaac A. Van Amburgh, American animal trainer (d. 1865)
  - William Robert Grove, Welsh chemist, inventor (d. 1896)
- July 13 – George Gilbert Scott, British architect (d. 1878)
- July 18 – William Makepeace Thackeray, British novelist (d. 1863)
- August 5 – Ambroise Thomas, French composer (d. 1896)
- August 11 – Judah P. Benjamin, Cabinet officer of the Confederate States (d. 1884)
- August 31 – Théophile Gautier, French writer (d. 1872)
- September 2 – J.C. Jacobsen, Danish industrialist, founder of Carlsberg Group (d. 1887)
- September 13 – Emmanuel Félix de Wimpffen, French general (d. 1884)
- September 19 – Orson Pratt, American religious leader (d. 1881)
- September 30 – Augusta of Saxe-Weimar-Eisenach, German empress (d. 1890)
- October 22 – Franz Liszt, Hungarian composer, pianist (d. 1886)
- October 24 – Georg August Wallin, Finnish orientalist, explorer and professor (d. 1852)
- October 25
  - Évariste Galois, French mathematician (d. 1832)
  - C. F. W. Walther, German-American theologian (d. 1887)
- October 27 – Stevens Thomson Mason, first governor of Michigan (d. 1843)
- October 31 – William Loring, British admiral (d. 1895)
- November 8 – John Tarleton, British admiral (d. 1880)
- November 21
  - Ludwik Gorzkowski, Polish politician, physicist and revolutionary activist (d. 1857)
  - Ludwig Preiss, German-born British botanical collector (d. 1883)
- November 24 – Ulrich Ochsenbein, Swiss Federal Councilor (d. 1890)
- November 26 – Zeng Guofan, Chinese official, military leader (d. 1872)
- November 28 – King Maximilian II of Bavaria (d. 1864)
- December 5 – Justus Carl Hasskarl, German explorer, botanist (d. 1894)
- December 21 – Archibald Campbell Tait, Archbishop of Canterbury (d. 1882)

=== Date unknown ===
- Mohammad Afzal Khan, Emir of Kabul, Emir of Kandahar (d. 1867)
- Ram Singh, Raja of Bundi (d. 1889)

== Deaths ==
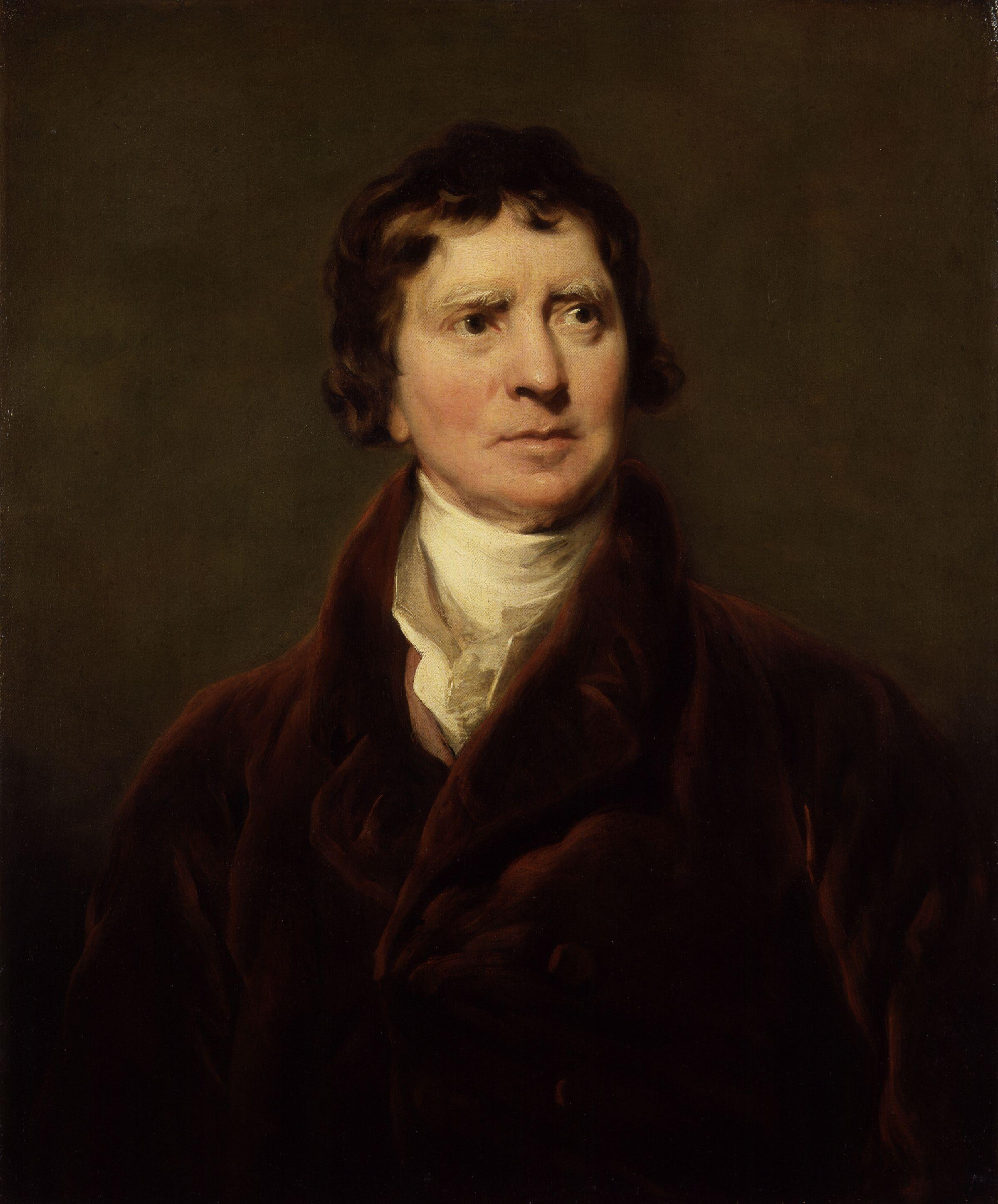
Henry Dundas, 1st Viscount Melville

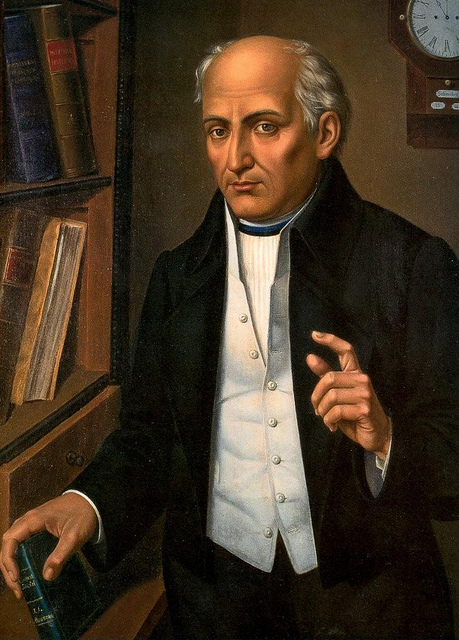
Miguel Hidalgo y Costilla

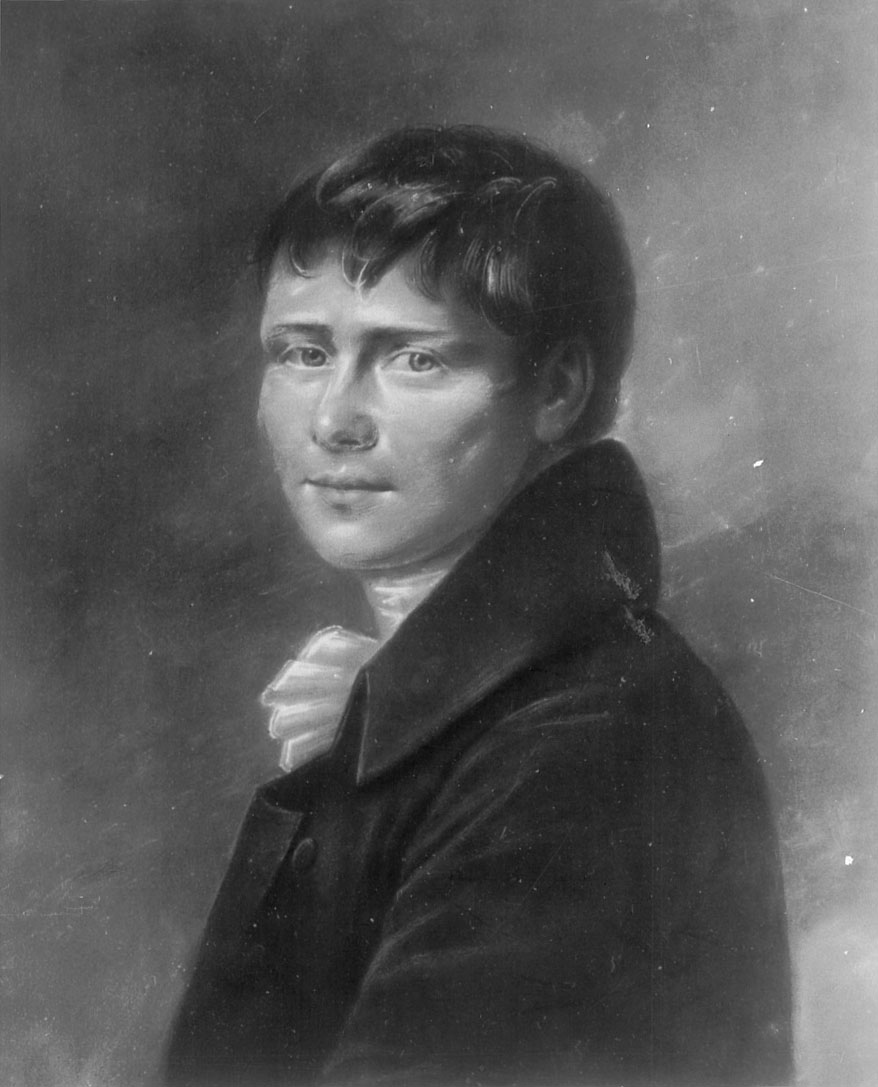
Heinrich von Kleist

- January 8 – Samuel Story, Dutch admiral (b. 1752)
- January 10 – Marie-Joseph Chénier, French poet (b. 1764)
- February 9 – Nevil Maskelyne, English Astronomer Royal (b. 1732)
- February 24 – James Brudenell, 5th Earl of Cardigan, English noble and politician (b. 1715)
- February 26 – Mateo de Toro Zambrano, 1st Count of La Conquista, Governor of Chile (b. 1727)
- March 12 – Judah Leib Ben-Ze'ev, Galician Jewish modern Hebrew philologist, lexicographer, Biblical scholar and poet (b. 1764)
- March 14 – Augustus FitzRoy, 3rd Duke of Grafton, Prime Minister of the United Kingdom (b. 1735)
- April 4 – Mary Woffington, Irish socialite (b. 1729)
- April 7 – Garsevan Chavchavadze, Georgian diplomat, politician (b. 1757)
- May 4 – Nikolay Kamensky, Russian general (b. 1776)
- May 28 – Henry Dundas, 1st Viscount Melville, British minister (b. 1742)
- June 19 – Samuel Chase, Associate Justice of the Supreme Court of the United States (b. 1741)
- June 26 – Ignacio Allende, captain of the Spanish Army in Mexico (b. 1769)
- July 29 – William Cavendish, 5th Duke of Devonshire (b. 1748)
- July 30 – Miguel Hidalgo y Costilla, leader of the Mexican War of Independence (b. 1753)
- August 2 – William Williams, Connecticut politician, signer of the United States Declaration of Independence (b. 1731)
- August 12 – Sir John Acton, 6th Baronet, Prime Minister of Naples (b. 1736)
- August 31 – Louis Antoine de Bougainville, French navigator, military commander (b. 1729)
- September – Ulrich Jasper Seetzen, German explorer (b. 1767)
- September 4 – Matsumura Goshun, Japanese artist (b. 1752)
- September 8 – Peter Simon Pallas, German zoologist (b. 1741)
- September 14 – Johanna Löfblad, Swedish actor, singer (b. 1733)
- September 21 – William Adams, British politician (b. 1752)
- October 11 – Johann Conrad Ammann, Swiss physician, naturalist (b. 1724)
- October 15 – Eva Merthen, Finnish political activist (b. 1723)
- November 21 – Heinrich von Kleist, German writer (suicide) (b. 1777)
- November 27 – Andrew Meikle, Scottish engineer (b. 1719)
