= Eisold =

Eisold is a surname. Notable people with the surname include:

- Dietmar Eisold (1947–2017), German journalist and art historian
- John Francis Eisold (born 1946), American physician
- Wesley Eisold (born 1979), American musician, poet, and author
