= Peter Robert Keil =

German painter and sculptor (born 1942)

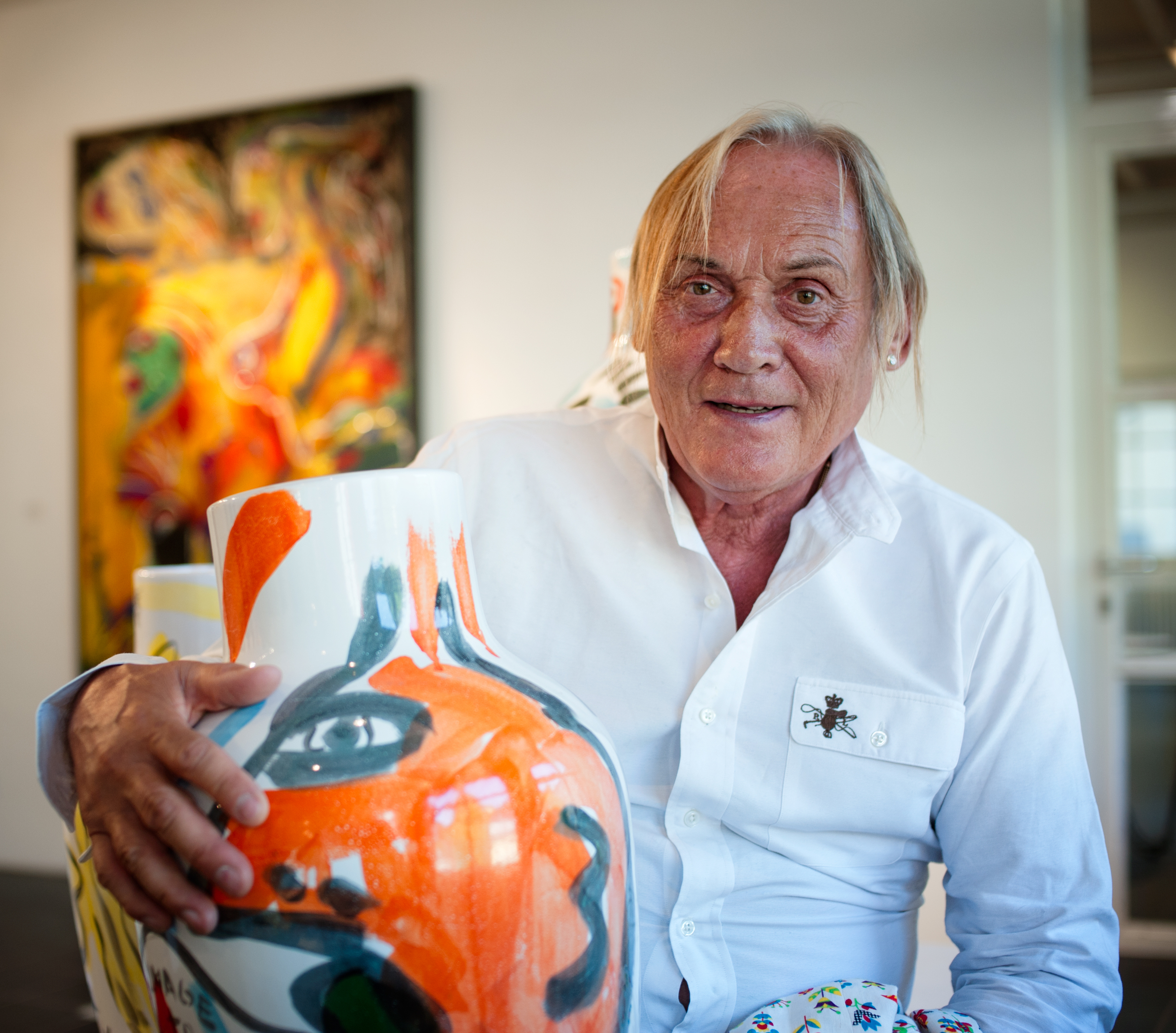
Peter Robert Keil with majolica 2012.

Peter Robert Keil (born 6 August 1942 in Züllichau, Brandenburg) is a German painter and sculptor.

== Life ==
Peter Robert Keil was born to an artist blacksmith father whom he lost very early in his childhood during World War II. During the end phase of the war, Keil's mother, also an artistically talented woman, took her son and struggled her way to West Berlin where they settled. This is where Peter Robert Keil grew up in the working-class neighbourhood of Berlin-Wedding and where he discovered his interest in painting—particularly in expressionistic artists and in Pablo Picasso's work. From 1954 on, the East Berlin-based painter Otto Nagel became his mentor and taught him first craft skills and painting techniques. In 1954, he began his traineeship as an artist metalworker and between 1959 and 1961, he studied at the University of Arts in Berlin. When the Berlin Wall was built, he lost contact with his mentor Otto Nagel and from the early 60s on, Keil started to spend more and more time abroad. During his studies at the University of Arts in Berlin, he came in contact with numerous other artists who later became influential artists of their generation, like for example Georg Baselitz, Eugen Schönebeck, Markus Lüpertz and Joachim Schmettau. During his time in Mallorca, he also met with Joan Miró in his studio several times. From the early 60s on, Keil established studios in Paris, London, Berlin and in the US. Today he mainly lives and works in Zimmerau (Bavaria, Germany), Berlin and Los Angeles.

== Techniques and works ==
In the beginnings of his artistic career, Peter Keil's style was influenced by German expressionism. In the works from his early Berlin years, he mainly focused on typical big city settings and characters on the fringes of society. However, his style changed visibly at the beginning of the 60s when he lived in Paris for a while and emerged in the city's nightlife. Keil increasingly parted with his realistic approach and developed a new, much more spontaneous and dynamic painting style which he developed further during his years in London and finally during his time as one of the "Berliner Neue Wilden" at the beginning of the 80s. Since then, the use of intensive to lurid colours and the absence of realistic representation have become characteristic of his painting style. In his paintings, the colour is applied with quick brushstrokes and occasionally with impasto techniques and the images are additionally abstracted by the use of Graffiti elements. Keil prefers to paint human figures, portraits, big city scenes, landscapes and still life images of flowers. His emotional way of painting is mainly driven by a desire for freedom from social constraints and conventions. In the past 50 years, he has created numerous large- and small scale paintings in oil and mixed media on canvas but also some sculptures in wood and steel and a great number of majolicas.

== Exhibitions ==
- 1962: First solo exhibition at the Art Gallery, London
- 1964: Galerie Rotebro, Sweden
- 1965: Great Berlin Art Exhibition
- 1966: Great Berlin Art Exhibition
- 1980: Dr. Friedmann Gallery, Israel
- 1985: Wewerka Gallery, Berlin
- 1986–1990: Free Art Exhibition, Berlin, Exhibition Hall, Berlin
- 1993: Carousel Gallery, Dania, Florida, USA
- 1998: Aventura Art Gallery, Aventura, Florida, USA
- 1999: Höckner Gallery, Salzburg, Austria
- 2000: Exhibitions Paris, Amsterdam, London
- 2001–2005: Intercontinental Hotel Berlin
- 2002: International Art Fair, Frankfurt
- 2003: The Sixties Peter Robert Keil, Kunstsinn Gallery, Nuremberg
- 2005: Boxsler Gallery, Lichtenfels
- 2006: Public Library, Fort Lauderdale, Florida, USA
- 2007: Villa Meixner, collection of the KulturForum Europa, Brühl/Baden
- 2007: Kessler Corporation, Orlando Florida, Savannah, Georgia, USA
- 2008: The Hurn Museum, Savannah, USA
- 2010: Keil-Collection Heidelberg, Long Night of the Museums, Heidelberg
- 2010: Edna Hibel Fine Art Gallery, West Palm Beach, Florida
- 2011: Keil-Collection Heidelberg, Long Night of the Museums, Heidelberg
- 2011: Edinburgh International Art Festival. Scotland. Presented by Colin Fleming (Rivertown Gallery).
- 2012: Retrospective "Leben im Farbrausch" (A Life in Colours), Castle Schwetzingen, Orangery
- 2012: "Teufelswerk" (Devil's Work), State Majolica Manufacture Karlsruhe
- 2013: Aufbruch – Jüngste Werke aus der Heidelberger Phase (A new era – Most recent works from the Heidelberg phase), Alte Feuerwache Heidelberg
- 2014: Recent works, Berlin, Temporäre Galerie Potsdamer Straße
- 2014: New Keil works, Keil Collection Heidelberg, Heidelberg
- 2014 / 2015: Peter Robert Keil in the Heidelberg city hall, City Hall Heidelberg
- 2015: "Verleden, heden, toekomst", Waaggebouw Arnheim
- 2015: Peter Robert Keil in the Roman Cellar, Roman Cellar Heidelberg
- 2015: Peter Robert Keil in Alten Hallenbad, Altes Hallenbad Heidelberg
- 2015: "P.R. Keil – der neueste Brand", Staatliche Majolika Manufaktur Karlsruhe
- 2015: Exhibition in the Museumszimmer at Wolfsbrunnen, Wolfsbrunnen Heidelberg
- 2016: art Karlsruhe 2016, Karlsruhe
- 2016: ART.FAIR, Köln
- 2016: Affordable Art Fair 2016, Hamburg
- 2016: Peter Robert Keil in the Galerie P13, Heidelberg
- 2017: art Karlsruhe 2017 - one artist show, Karlsruhe
- 2017: Solo exhibition, New Jersey, USA
- 2017: Roter Kunstsalon, Museum Villa Rot, Burgrieden
- 2017: Affordable Art Fair 2017, Hamburg
- 2017: Exhibition at the Studio in Banyalbufar, Mallorca
- 2017: Solo show "Leben im Farbrausch 2", Castle Heidelberg
- 2018: art Karlsruhe 2018 - one artist show, Karlsruhe
- 2018 Affordable Art Fair Hamburg / Affordable Art Fair Brüssel
- 2019 art Karlsruhe, Galerie P 13
- 2019 Affordable Art Fair Hamburg / Affordable Art Fair Brüssel
- 2021 Artist-in-residence im Xylon Museum Schwetzingen
- 2022 Artist-in-residence Xylon Museum Schwetzingen
- 2022 Exhibition at the Studio in Xylon Museum Schwetzingen
- 2022 "ICoulor - a painter says I" - Exhibition in the Heidelberg Castle.

== Literature ==
- Allgemeines Künstlerlexikon, Volume 79, De Gruyter Verlag, Berlin 2012
- Art Profil – Zeitschrift für aktuelle Kunst, Volume 2, 13. Jahrgang 2007
- Art Profil – Zeitschrift für aktuelle Kunst, Volume-No. 90-2011
- Art Profil – Zeitschrift für aktuelle Kunst, Volume-No. 93-2012
- Art Profil – Zeitschrift für aktuelle Kunst, Volume-No. 96-2013
- Art Profil – Zeitschrift für aktuelle Kunst Heft Nr. 105-2014 20. Jahrgang
- Edition Majolika – Schriftenreihe der Majolika-Stiftung für Kunst- und Kulturförderung Karlsruhe, Band 3
- Dietmar Eisold (pub.): Lexikon Künstler der DDR Verlag neues Leben Berlin, 2010, ISBN 978-3-355-01761-9
- Aufbruch - Die Keil Collection Heidelberg. Illustrierte Chronik Herbst 2012-2015, Heidelberg 2017, ISBN 978-1-36-421381-7
- Lust und Leidenschaft/Tod und Teufel. Ein Ausstellungskonzept, Edition Art Flow Berlin, 2011, ISBN 978-3-938457-11-5
- Hartmut Pätzke: Register „Ausgebürgert“, in: Hannelore Offner and Klaus Schroeder: Eingegrenzt – Ausgegrenzt. Bildende Kunst und Parteiherrschaft in der DDR 1961–1989, Akademie Verlag GmbH Berlin, 2000, ISBN 3-05-003348-7
- Valerie Sottile, Audrey E. Dillon und Michael Sottile: Peter Keil: Neo-Expressionist Artist, in: The Dial. A Philosophic Art Journal, Volume LXXXV, Number 2, Winter 2008
- Peter Robert Keil Fünfundsiebzig, Herausgeber: Keil Collection Heidelberg, Heidelberg 2017, ISBN 978-3-00-057568-6
- Peter Robert Keil Achtzig, Herausgeber: Keil Collection Heidelberg, Heidelberg 2022, ISBN 978-3-00-057568-6
- Werksverzeichnis. Catalogue Raisonné - Peter Robert Keil. Verzeichnis zertifizierter Gemälde, September 2017, Ed., Keil Collection Heidelberg.
