= Nicholas Forell =

German structural engineer

Nicholas F. Forell (1923 – February 19, 1998) was a structural engineer and a leading authority in the development of modern earthquake safety design. He was a founder and former president of the San Francisco firm Forell/Elsesser Engineers.

== Early life ==
Nicholas was born in Züllichau, Germany, in 1923. In 1941, he immigrated to the United States and began living in New York City.

=== Military service ===
After the attack on Pearl Harbor, Nicholas joined the United States Army in 1942, and was assigned to the Signal Corps (United States Army)' Heavy Construction Battalion operating with British troops in Myanmar.

== Education ==
Following the war, Nicholas was offered admission to the engineering program at Brown University, and he graduated in 1949. Shortly after graduation, he moved to San Francisco to begin his career at Sverdrup & Parcel.

== Notable projects ==
- Pacific Gas & Electric Headquarters seismic retrofit
- San Francisco Museum of Modern Art structural design
- Berkeley Civic Center seismic retrofit

== Utah State Capitol historic seismic retrofits ==
- W. M. Keck Observatory structural design

== Published works ==
- "Developments in earthquake design codes", 1981
- "Mexico earthquakes : Oaxaca - November 29, 1978, Guerrero", 1979

== Personal life ==
Married to Carol Forell. Daughters Katey (finance) and Anne (architect)
