= Heinz Felsch =

German painter and graphic artist

Heinz Felsch (14 July 1922 – 14 March 2016) was a German painter and graphic artist. He created a comprehensive oeuvre of oil paintings and mixed media. Since he had also trained as a lithographer, he produced a large number of lithographic prints in his own printing workshop. The themes of his paintings and graphic oeuvre are landscapes, still lives, and also portraits and people.

After completing school, Felsch did an apprenticeship in merchandising, which he could not complete due to the start of World War II. At the age of seventeen, he was enlisted into the German army and was moved to France, where he served as the chauffeur for a higher-ranking officer. After his first year in France, he was destined to be sent to Africa but instead was transferred to Russia, where he flew reconnaissance flights with the German air force. During one of the missions, he suffered a serious head injury which rendered him unfit to serve and he ended up in a hospital in Denmark where he stayed until the end of the war.

After the war, Felsch moved back to his hometown, Weißenfels. He started an apprenticeship as a lithographer. In 1946, he enrolled as a student at the art school Burg Giebichenstein in Halle and joined the art class with the teacher Professor Charles Crodel.

Felsch became part of group of painters which is now known as the “Hallesche Schule” (school of Halle). It was a movement of modern painting during a period from 1945 until the late 1950s, under the influence of the professors of fine art Charles Crodel and Erwin Hahs. The term “Hallesche Schule” describes a specific regional movement rooted in classic modern art.

Felsch had a close personal and artistic bond with the painter Albert Ebert, which started when both met as art students and continued until Ebert died in 1976. This close artistic bond is reflected in many of his paintings.

When Crodel was appointed professor for Fine Art at the Munich Art Academy in 1951, he asked Felsch to join him as his assistant and lithographer. After some consideration, he decided to stay in Halle due to family circumstances.

In 1949, Felsch married his fellow student Brigitte Reiff. They both met at art school, as Brigitte was part of the same group of students under Crodel. They had a son and two daughters.

Felsch and his wife regularly spent the summer months during the late 1940s to the mid-1950s in Ahrenshoop, a little fishing village on the Baltic Sea, known for their artist community. A number of paintings, drawings and lithographic prints originate from this time and reflect the partly rough but also gentle landscapes between the sea, with its dunes and cliffs, and the Bodden laguna.

Felsch, with the support of his wife, worked on larger scale commissions of architectural art from the mid-1960s to the late 1970s, which were mainly mosaic wall friezes in the lobbies of newly built hospitals and schools. There are still two of the previously three larger wall mosaics in the lift lobbies of the Policlinic Reil in Halle. A further 17-meter long wall mosaic frieze can still be seen in a school in Braunsbedra near Halle.

In the late 1970s when their commercial opportunities were not as plentiful, the couple started to produce their own range of small ceramic medallions and ceramic jewellery, which helped to support them financially.

Felsch carried on painting right up into his 90s. He particularly took pride in the frames of his paintings, which were meticulously made and most of them applied with a layer of flat silver.

In 1951, Felsch became a member of the Landesverband Bildender Künstler Sachsen-Anhalt (National Association of Fine Arts of Sachsen-Anhalt) and in 1952, he became member of the ‘Verband Bildender Künstler der DDR’ (National Association of Fine Arts of the GDR). He took part in numerous group exhibitions throughout Germany to include earlier participation in the art exhibitions of the GDR. 2014 Participation in exhibition of Crodel students in Halle. 2017 Exhibition of paintings, lithographic prints and drawings In London at STUDIO_13A. 2018 Exhibition "Heinz Felsch 1922 - 2016" Kunstkaten Ahrenshoop in corporation with Galerie Alte Schule Ahrenshoop.

2018 "Heinz Felsch 1922 - 2016" published in Hasenverlag Halle/Saale with introduction by Dr Paul Kaiser, Dresdener Institut für Kulturstudien.
