= Johann Gottfried Ebel =

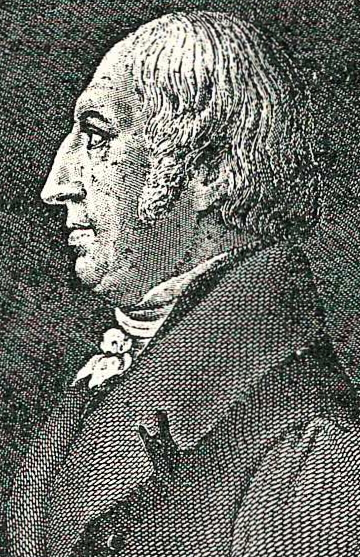
Johann Gottfried Ebel, copperplate from 1833

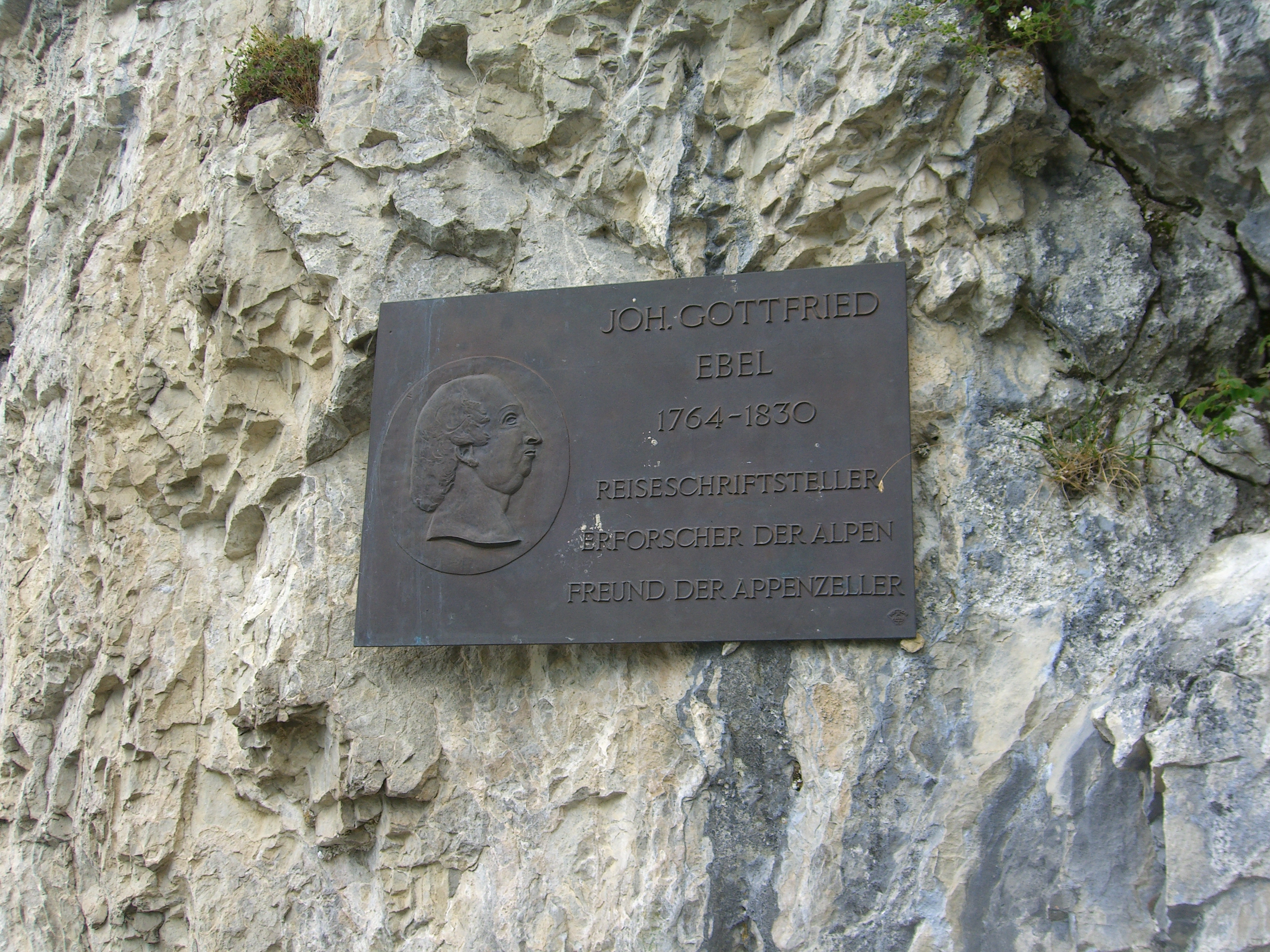
Memorial tablet to Johann Gottfried Ebel on the Ebenalp, Appenzell, Switzerland

Johann Gottfried Ebel (6 October 1764 – 8 October 1830) was the author of the first real guidebook to Switzerland.

== Biography ==
He was born at Zullichau (Prussia). He became a medical man, visited Switzerland for the first time in 1790, and became so enamoured of it that he spent three years exploring the country and collecting all kinds of information relating to it. The result was the publication (Zürich, 1793) of his Anleitung, auf die nützlichste und genussvollste Art in der Schweitz zu reisen (2 vols), in which he gave a complete account of the country, the General Information sections being followed by an alphabetically arranged list of places, with descriptions. It at once superseded all other works of the kind, and was the best Swiss guidebook until the appearance of Murray (1838).

It was particularly strong on the geological and historical sides. The second (1804–1805) and third (1809–1810) editions filled four volumes, but the following (the 8th appeared in 1843) were in a single volume. The work was translated into French in 1795 (many later editions) and into English (by 1818).

Ebel also published a work (2 vols, Leipzig, 1798 1802) entitled Schilderungen der Gebirgsvölker der Schweiz, which deals mainly with the pastoral cantons of Glarus and Appenzell. In 1801 he was naturalized a Swiss citizen, and settled down in Zürich. In 1808 he issued his chief geological work, Über den Bau der Erde im Alpengebirge (Zürich, 2 vols). He took an active share in promoting all that could make his adopted country better known, e.g. Heinrich Keller's map (1813), the building of a hotel on the Rigi (1816), and the preparation of a panorama from that point (1823). From 1810 onwards he lived at Zürich, with the family of his friend, Conrad Escher von der Linth (1767–1823), a celebrated engineer.
