= Hermann Marggraff =

German writer (1809–1864)

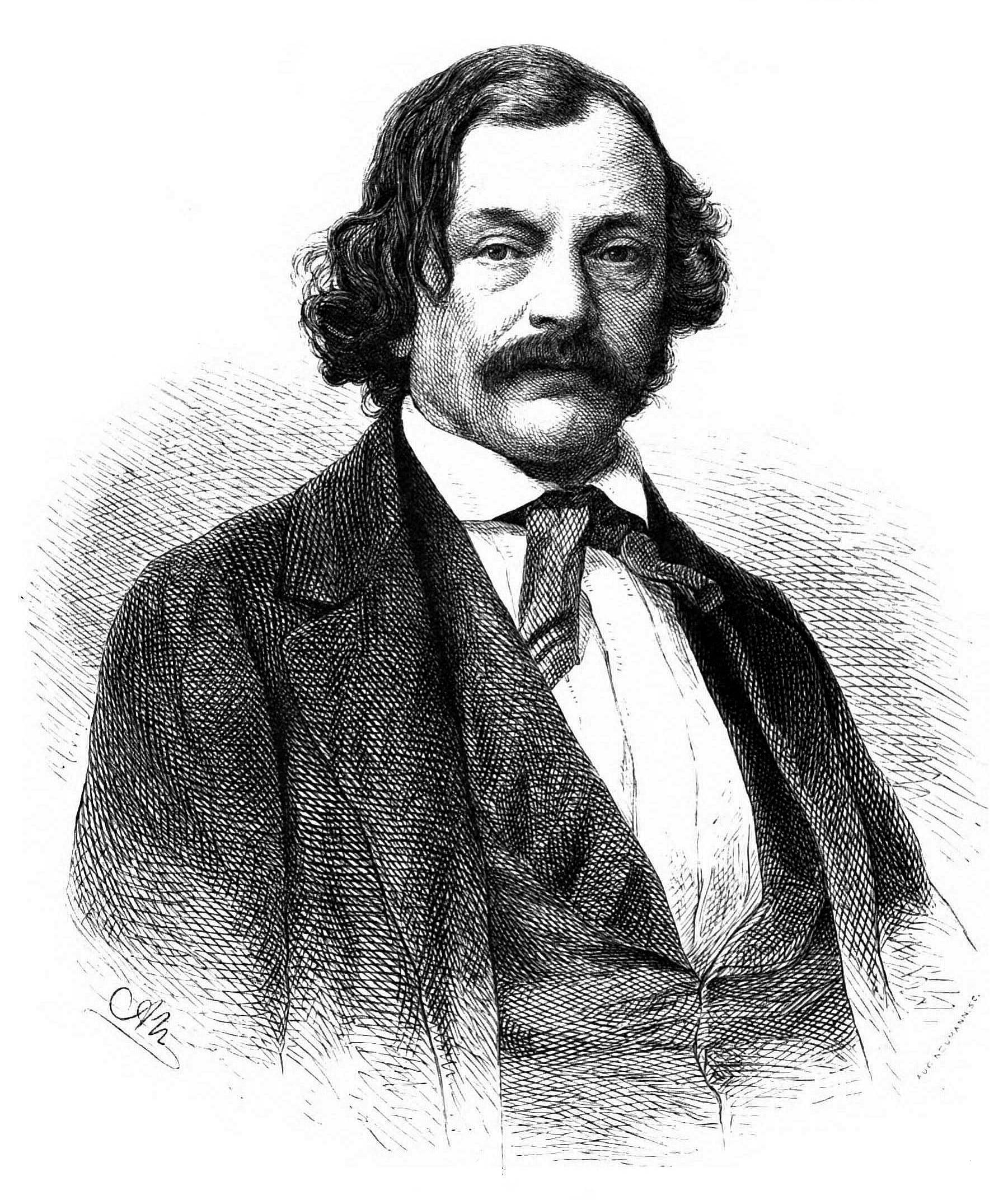
Hermann Margraff

Hermann Marggraff (1809–1864) was a German poet and humorous author. He was born at Züllichau, Kingdom of Prussia and studied at Berlin; and, devoting himself to journalism, lived and wrote in Leipzig, Munich, Augsburg, and Frankfort, finally settling in Leipzig (1853) as editor of the Blätter für literarische Unterhaltung. He wrote the critical essay, Deutschlands Jüngste Kultur- und Litteraturepoche (1839); several plays, e. g., Das Täubchen von Amsterdam; humorous novels, including Justus und Chrysostomus, Gebrüder Pech (1840), Johannes Mackel (1841), and Fritz Beutel (1855), after the fashion of Baron Munchausen; a biography of Ernst Schulze (Leipzig, 1855); Schillers und Kärners Freundschaftsbund (1859); Gedichte (1857); Balladenchronik (1862).
