= Carl Friedrich Ernst Frommann =

German publisher and bookseller

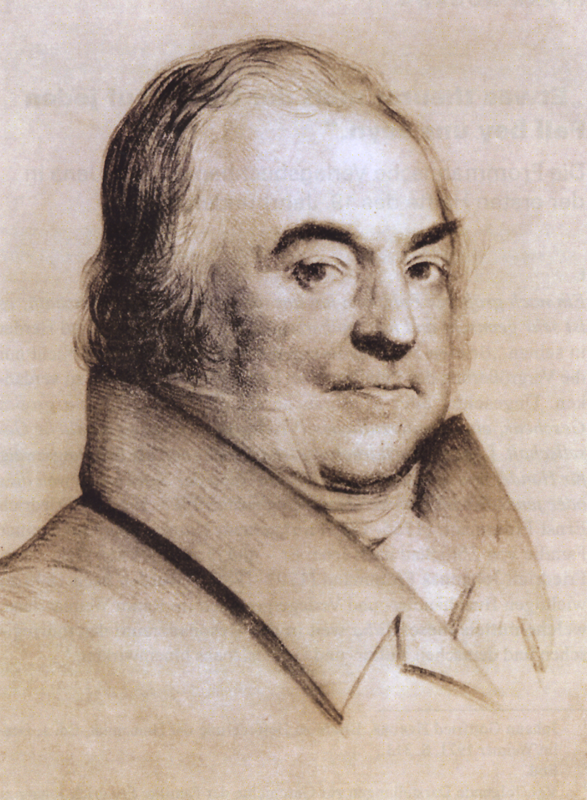
C. F. E. Frommann; portrait by Johann Joseph Schmeller (1830)

Carl Friedrich Ernst Frommann (14 September 1765, Züllichau – 12 June 1837, Jena) was a German publisher and bookseller.

== Life and work ==
His father, Nathanael Siegismund Frommann (1736-1786), was also a bookseller. He received his training in Berlin, from the publisher August Mylius, and took over the family business after his father's death. Up to then, the firm had focused exclusively on books related to theology and philosophy, but he expanded their catalog to include school and language dictionaries; notably the Kritische Griechisch-Deutsche Handwörterbuch (Concise Greek-German Dictionary, 1797) by Johann Gottlob Theaenus Schneider. In 1798, he relocated to Jena, to be closer to what was then the intellectual center of Germany.

Most of the famous authors of the time became his clients, and his home was a gathering place for the cultural community. Within a year, he had opened his own printing shop and married Johanna Wesselhöfft (1765–1830), with whom he had a son and raised a foster daughter, Wilhelmine Herzlieb ("Minna"), who became a favorite of Goethe. She is said to have inspired the character of "Ottilie" in his Elective Affinities, as well as several sonnets.

In 1825, he took his son, Friedrich Johannes, into the publishing business. Five years later, he retired. In 1836, he was awarded an Honorary Citizenship by the city of Leipzig.

The Frommannsche Verlag still exists, under the name Frommann-Holzboog Verlag. Their focus is on philosophy, theology, psychology and related subjects. Since 1886, they have been located in Stuttgart.

== Sources ==
- Friedrich Johannes Frommann (1878). "Frommann, C. F. E.". Allgemeine Deutsche Biographie (in German). Vol. 8. Leipzig: Duncker & Humblot. pp. 140–143.
- Hans Wahl, Anton Kippenberg (Eds.: Goethe und seine Welt. Insel-Verlag, Leipzig 1932, pp.178, 282.
- Hans Lülfing (1961). "Frommann, Carl Friedrich Ernst". Neue Deutsche Biographie (in German). Vol. 5. Berlin: Duncker & Humblot. pp. 658–659. (full text online).
- Friedrich Beck, Eckart Henning (Eds.): Brandenburgisches Biographisches Lexikon, Verlag für Berlin-Brandenburg, Potsdam 2002, ISBN 3-935035-39-X
