= Minna Herzlieb =

German publisher (1789–1865)

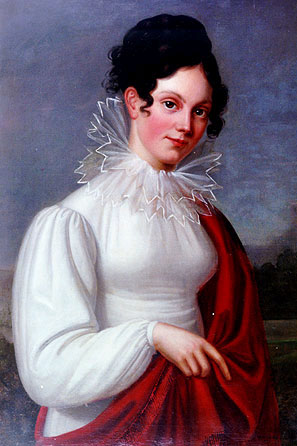
Portrait of Herzlieb by Louise Seidler

Christiane Friederike Wilhelmine Herzlieb, known as Minna (22 May 1789 – 10 July 1865) was the foster-daughter of the German publisher Carl Friedrich Ernst Frommann.

== Biography ==
Herzlib was born on 22 May 1789, in Züllichau, to the superintendent of her birthplace. Orphaned in infancy, she was brought up in the house of the publisher Carl Friedrich Ernst Frommann in Jena. In 1807 she came to Weimar, where she met Goethe, who presented her with some sonnets. She also served as an inspiration for the character of "Ottilie" in his Elective Affinities.

In 1821, she married professor Karl Wilhelm Walch but it was not a love match and may have contributed to her mental breakdown and death in a mental hospital in Görlitz, on 10 July 1865, aged 76.
