= Sulechów =

Town in Lubusz Voivodeship, Poland

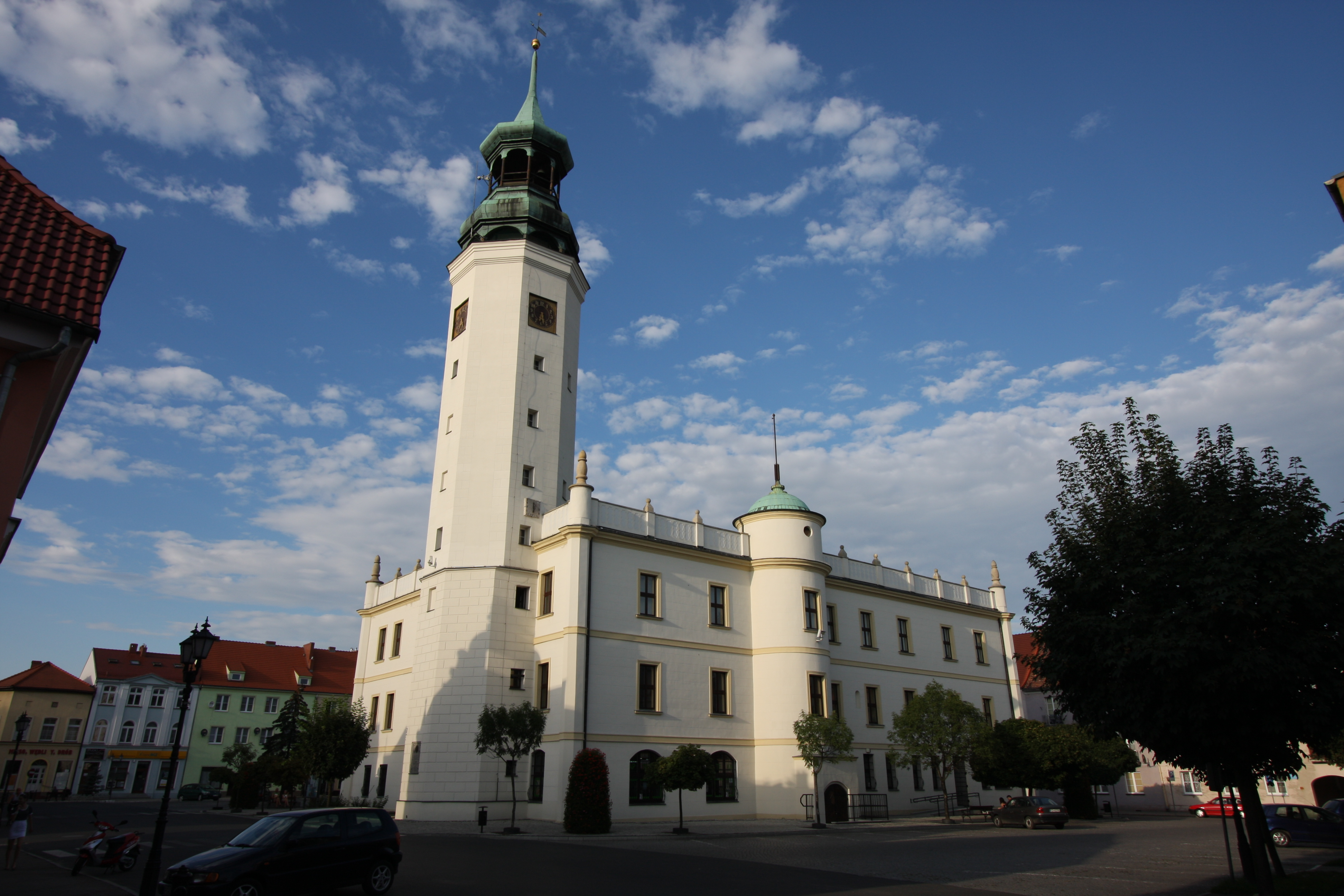
- Town hall

- Flag Coat of arms
- Interactive map of Sulechów
- Location within Poland
- Coordinates: 52°5′N 15°37′E
- Country: Poland
- Voivodeship: Lubusz
- County: Zielona Góra
- Gmina: Sulechów

Government
  - Mayor: Wojciech Sołtys (2018–2029)

Area
  - Total: 6.83 km^{2} (2.64 sq mi)

Population (2024-06-30)
  - Total: 14,035
  - Density: 2,050/km^{2} (5,320/sq mi)
- Time zone: UTC+1 (CET)
  - Summer (DST): UTC+2 (CEST)
- Postal code: 66-100
- Area code: +48 68
- Vehicle registration: FZI
- Climate: Cfb
- Primary airport: Zielona Góra Airport
- Website: www.sulechow.pl

Sulechów (pronounced Sue-leh-hoof [suˈlɛxuf], German: Züllichau) is a town located within the Zielona Góra County, in Lubusz Voivodeship, western Poland. It is the administrative seat of the Gmina Sulechów. Established in the Middle Ages, the town features many historical monuments significant to the Polish Lubusz region. The town limits cover 6.83 square kilometres (2.64 sq mi).

== Geography ==
Sulechów is situated in the historic Lower Silesia region, north of the Oder river. The town centre is located about 22 km (14 mi) northeast of the regional capital Zielona Góra, where the national road 32 to Poznań crosses the expressway S3 to Gorzów Wielkopolski. The regional Zielona Góra Airport is about 14 km (8.7 mi) away.

== History ==
The settlement of the region on the Middle Oder dates back to the 4th century AD.

=== Medieval Poland ===
In the late 10th century, the area was included in the emerging Polish state by its first historic ruler Mieszko I of the Piast dynasty. It became part of the Duchy of Silesia, a province of fragmented Poland, in 1138, and, later belonged to the Silesian Duchy of Głogów, established in 1249–1251 under the rule of Duke Konrad I. In the beginning of the 14th century, Sulechów was encompassed by defensive walls.

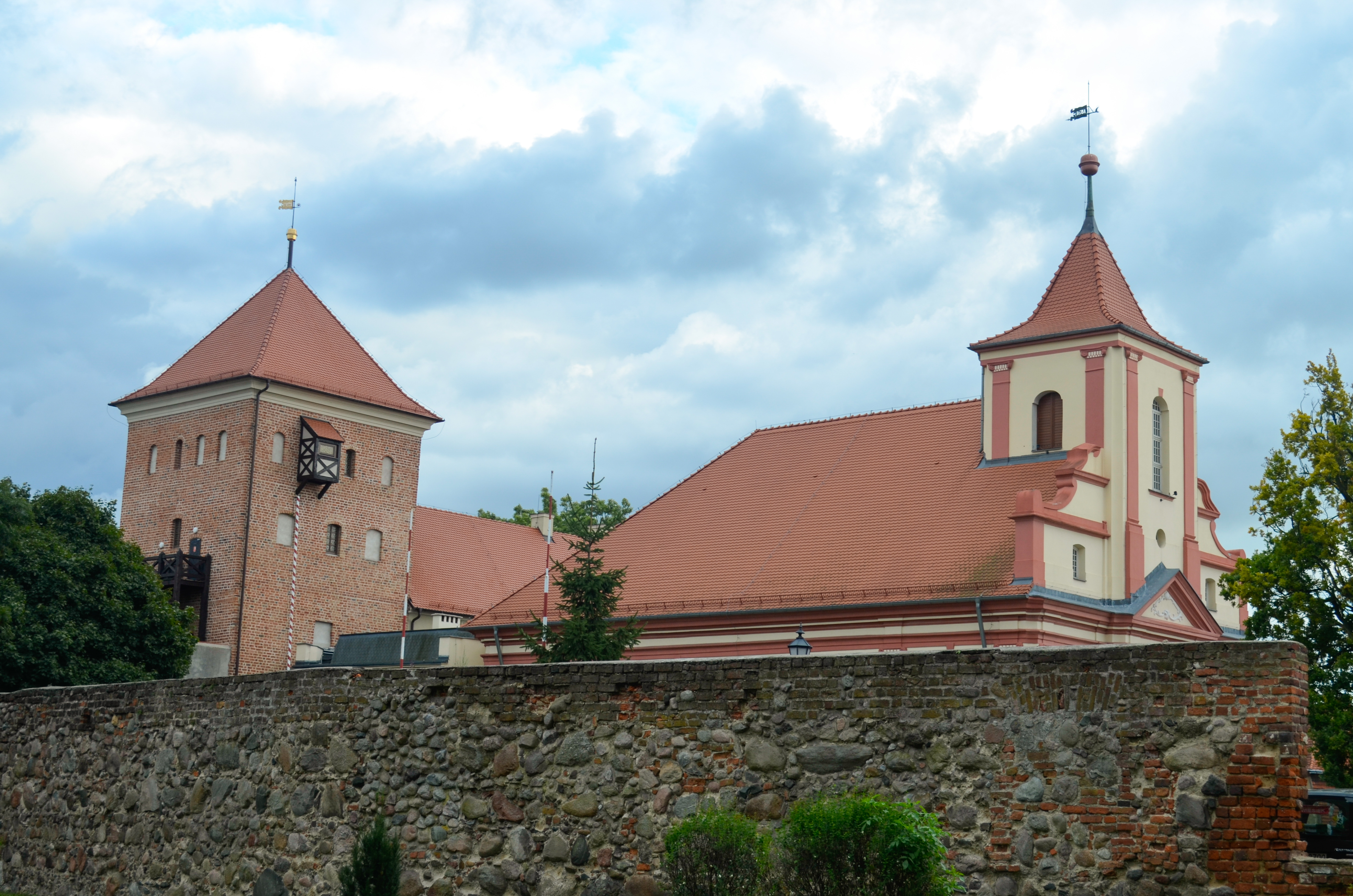
Sulechów Castle and former Calvinist church

The settlement itself was first mentioned in a 1319 deed, at the time when the warlike Ascanian margrave Waldemar of Brandenburg campaigned the area, occupying Sulechów and neighbouring Świebodzin. Margrave Waldemar, however, died in the same year, and the localities fell back to the Piast dukes of Głogów.

When the last Piast duke Henry XI of Głogów died without issue in 1476, inheritance claims were raised by his widow Barbara of Brandenburg and her father, the Hohenzollern elector Albrecht Achilles. The Brandenburg influence met with fierce opposition by Henry's Piast cousin, Duke Jan II the Mad of Żagań, who nevertheless after several years of fighting had to sign an agreement, whereby the Silesian towns of Crossen (Krosno) and the town passed to the Margraviate of Brandenburg as a fief of the Bohemian (Czech) Kingdom, an integral part of the Holy Roman Empire.

=== Modern era ===
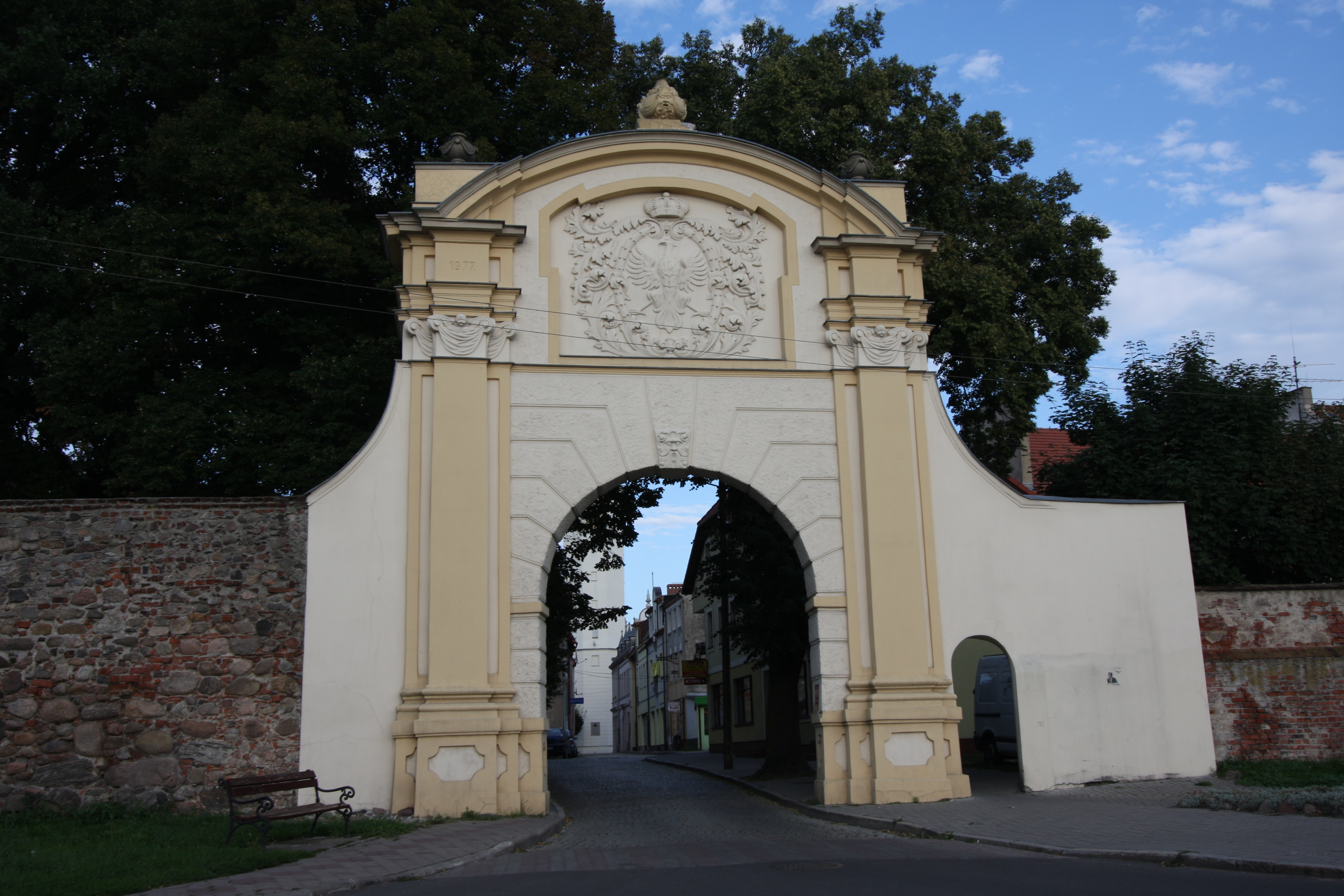
Krosno Gate

Along with Crossen, Sulechów, under the Germanized name Züllichau, was incorporated into the Brandenburg Neumark district by 1535, ruled by Margrave John of Brandenburg-Küstrin who implemented the Protestant Reformation. Two years later, the Piast duke Joachim of Münsterberg-Oels and his younger brothers officially waived any rights to the Crossen and Züllichau territories. Part of Brandenburg-Prussia from 1618, the town was devastated during the Thirty Years' War but again flourished under the rule of the "Great Elector" Frederick William. From the 17th century, clothmaking developed. Polish Reformed Church services were held in the town between 1684 and 1725.

Züllichau was part of the newly established Kingdom of Prussia since 1701. It became a garrison town of the Prussian Army. In March 1735, officials of the confederation of King Stanisław Leszczyński's supporters in the War of the Polish Succession stopped in the town. The Polish population resisted Germanisation attempts, carried out by the Prussian authorities. From 1815 it belonged to the Province of Brandenburg and became the administrative seat of the Züllichau-Schwiebus rural district within the Frankfurt Region. In 1828, 18-year-old Frédéric Chopin visited the town and gave an improvised concert. Between 1871 and 1945 Züllichau was part of the German Reich. In the late 19th century, the medieval town walls were partly dismantled. Four Polish insurgents of the Greater Poland uprising died in German captivity in the town in 1919.

During World War II the Germans established two forced labour camps in the town, mainly for the Soviets. In 1945, a German-perpetrated death march of Jewish women from a just dissolved subcamp of the Gross-Rosen concentration camp in Sława passed through the town. The territory was conquered by Red Army forces during the Vistula-Oder Offensive in the final stage of World War II. In accordance with the Potsdam Agreement, the town was incorporated into the Republic of Poland by the implementation of the Oder–Neisse line in 1945, while the remaining German population was expelled. The remaining Polish inhabitants were joined by Poles displaced from former eastern Poland annexed by the Soviet Union. The town was renamed to Sulechów.

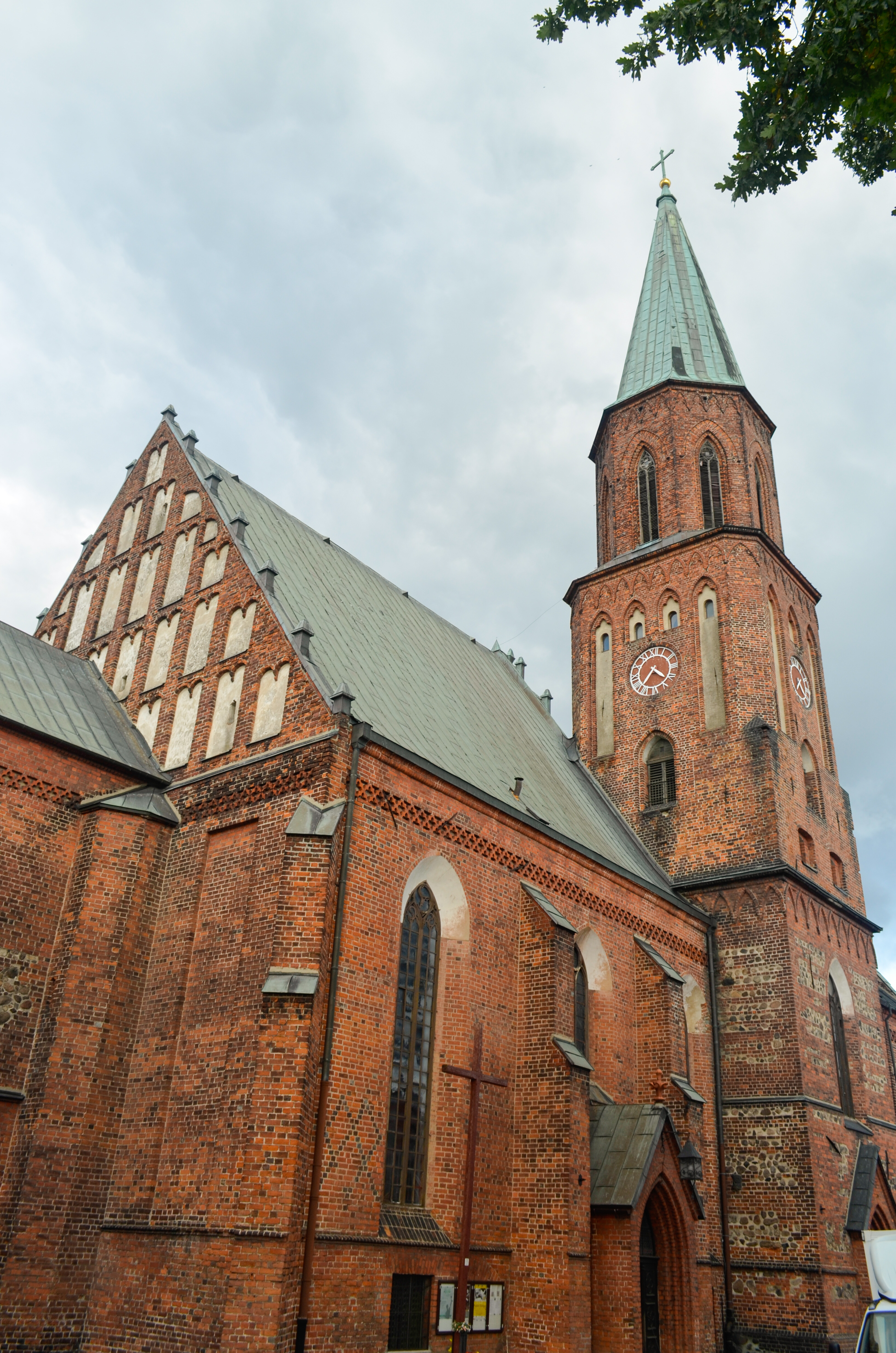
Holy Cross Church

From 1975 to 1998 Sulechów was part of Zielona Góra Voivodeship.

== Sports ==
The town's most notable sports clubs are football team Lech Sulechów and volleyball team Orion Sulechów. Both teams compete in the lower leagues.

== Notable people ==
- Johann Gottfried Rösner (1658–1724), mayor of Thorn (Toruń) as a consequence of the Tumult of Thorn
- Caspar Neumann (1683–1737), first pharmaceutical professor at the Berlin Collegium Medico-Chirurgicum
- Johann Gottfried Ebel (1764–1830), author of guidebook to Switzerland
- Carl Friedrich Ernst Frommann (1765–1837), bookseller and publisher
- Minna Herzlieb (1789–1865), role model for "Ottilie" in Goethes "Die Wahlverwandtschaften"
- Hermann Marggraff (1809–1864), author
- Theodor Kullak (1818–1882) pianist, composer was educated in the town
- Rüdiger Graf von der Goltz (1865–1946), a German Major-General during World War I and Estonian War of Independence
- Gerhard Benack (1915–1994), German officer
- Nicholas Forell (1923–1998), engineer
- Peter Robert Keil (born 1942), German painter and sculptor
- Olga Tokarczuk (born 1962), writer, winner of the Man Booker International Prize as well as the Nobel Prize in Literature
- Mela Koteluk (born 1985), singer

=== Sport ===
- Klaus-Dieter Ludwig (1943–2016), German rowing coxswain
- Ewa Bućko (born 1960), volleyball player
- Łukasz Żygadło (born 1979), volleyball player
- Natalia Bamber-Laskowska (born 1982), volleyball player
- Tomasz Kędziora (born 1994), Polish international footballer, born in Sulechów
- Tymoteusz Puchacz (born 1999), Polish international footballer, born in Sulechów

== Twin towns – sister cities ==
See twin towns of Gmina Sulechów.
