= Johann Gottfried Roesner =

Royal Prussian official (1658 – 1724)

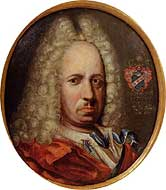
Anonymous painting of Roesner, c. 1730, city museum of Toruń

Johann Gottfried Roesner (also spelled Rösner; 21 November 1658 – 7 December 1724) was an official from Royal Prussia (a fief of the Crown of Poland) executed following the Tumult of Thorn.

Roesner was born in Züllichau (Sulechów) in Brandenburg's Neumark. The Burgrave of Thorn (Toruń) by 1703, he was the town's burgomaster and the curator of the municipal Thorn Gymnasium by 1706. As were most other leading citizens, he was of the Lutheran faith.

Following the Tumult of Thorn between Catholics and Lutherans in the summer of 1724, Roesner was sentenced to death for "neglecting his duty and countenancing tumult" by the Polish supreme court in Warsaw. He died in Thorn.
