= John Joachim Zubly =

American politician

John Zubly
- Born: Hans Joachim Zublin; 27 August 1724; St. Gallen
- Died: 23 July 1781 (aged 56); Savannah, Georgia, United States

Reverend John Joachim Zubly (August 27, 1724 – July 23, 1781), born Hans Joachim Züblin, was a Swiss-born American pastor, planter, and statesman during the American Revolution. Although a delegate for Georgia to the Continental Congress in 1775, he resisted independence from Great Britain and became a Loyalist.

== Early life and career ==
Zubly was born in St. Gall, Switzerland, on August 27, 1724. He was ordained to the German [Reformed] Church ministry in London on 19 August 1744. Following that, he came to South Carolina, where his father David Zublin had settled near the Savannah River in 1735. He preached first at small congregations south of Savannah. In 1746, he married Anna Tobler, daughter of Appenzell Ausserrhoden governor and later New Windsor Township founder Johannes Tobler. He then spent 10 years as minister at the Wappetaw Church near Charleston, an interesting congregation composed largely of descendants of a shipwreck that carried Congregationalists from New England. In 1756, he visited and preached to a congregation in Savannah. They were so impressed with him that he was later invited to their newly created pulpit. So in 1760, he moved to Savannah and became the first pastor of the Independent Presbyterian Church there.

Reverend Zubly's relationship to the Revolution reflects the confusion and conflict inherent in the shift of ideas during his time. Zubly's Calvinist religious beliefs made him an outspoken and influential supporter of the colonists' rights. By 1775, Zubly had come to view what he saw as the increasingly secular and godless resistance of the colonies with alarm. Many view his career as moving from a staunch defender of colonial rights, to an apologist for the monarchy, to a loyalist and opponent of republican government. However, it was his religious beliefs that remained constant, while the political environment shifted around him.

== Start of the revolution ==
After the Stamp Act in 1765, some of his sermons began to be issued as pamphlets, most notably An Humble Enquiry Into the Nature of the Dependency of the American Colonies upon the Parliament of Great-Britain and the Right of Parliament to Lay Taxes on the said Colonies. His reasoning helped to clarify the differences and relationships between constitutions, legislatures, laws, and people. Bernard Bailyn credits him with making important contributions to the consideration of representative legislatures by identifying some of the issues involved.

In the period leading up to the Revolution, he was not a member of the Georgia Assembly. But, he was frequently called on to open their sessions with prayer and a sermon. Georgia was not represented in the First Continental Congress of 1774, but in July 1775, they held a revolutionary congress in Savannah and Zubly was named as one of their delegates to the Second Continental Congress in Philadelphia.

In 1774, he published Great Britain's right to tax her colonies, placed in the clearest light, by a Swiss.

== The Continental Congress ==
John Zubly took his seat as a delegate in Philadelphia on September 15, 1775. Early in his time at the Congress he expressed his position by saying, "I came here with two views; one, to secure the rights of America; second, a reconciliation with Great Britain.". His distance from the sentiments of the Congress as a whole widened during debates over non-importation or trade embargoes. Georgia's development was so recent that she lacked even the limited manufacturing capabilities that existed in most of the other colonies, and it was the least self-sufficient of any.

As the other delegates argued for unity and conformance with the majority views, he became increasingly outspoken. By October 12, as the debate continued he observed that "Trade is important.... Wisdom is better than weapons of war. We don't mean to oppose Great Britain, merely for diversion; if it is necessary, that we make war, and that we have the means of it." When pushed he declared that "A republican government is little better than government of devils."

By mid-November, Zubly was on his way back to Savannah. The Congress had accused him of disloyalty since he was still carrying on a correspondence with his friend, James Wright, the Royal Governor of Georgia. He resumed his pulpit, and still sought a reconciliation in which Britain would respect colonists' rights.

== Exile and return ==
As the revolutionary fervor rose in Georgia, the Council of Safety decided that his "going at large will... endanger the public safety". So on July 1, 1776, Archibald Bulloch ordered his arrest, but Zubly was able to escape and find refuge with his family in South Carolina. Half his property was seized, and his library was thrown into the Savannah River by Georgians.

When the British recaptured Savannah in 1778, he was able to return home. Beginning in August 1780, the Savannah newspaper The Royal Georgia Gazette published a series of nine essays written by Zubly, who used the pseudonym of Helvetius. In these essays, Zubly laid out his case for opposing the American Revolution. Zubly made the case that the revolutionists were violating both God's law and international law. He died in Savannah on July 23, 1781 before the end of the American Revolutionary War. Though it is rumored that he is buried at Savannah's Colonial Cemetery, his grave has never been found.
