= Ludovico Sabbatini =

17th and 18th-century Italian Catholic priest

Venerable Ludovico Sabbatini
- Born: 30 August 1650; Naples, Italy
- Died: 11 June 1724; Naples, Italy
- Venerated in: Roman Catholicism
- Feast: 11 June

Ludovico Sabbatini (30 August 1650 – 11 June 1724) was an Italian priest and religious educator, who was beatified by the Catholic Church in 1765. He is venerated on 11 June, the day of his death.

== Life ==
Born in Naples, Italy, to a deeply religious family (one of his sisters was a nun, and three other brothers were priests), at a very young age Sabbatini dedicated himself to a religious life. He had a particular devotion to the Trinity.

He involved himself with the Congregazione dei Pii Operai (Congregation of Pious Workers), teaching religion to the children of the poor and manual laborers of Naples and assisting in the celebration of mass at the Church of San Nicola alla Caritá, a renowned center of spirituality. In this church he was in charge of the so-called Congregazione dei Figlioli (Congregation of Sons).

Sabbatini was ordained a priest at age 24 and soon began to teach at the religious academies of San Giorgio Maggiore and Santa Maria ai Monte. In 1684 he founded a monastery near the Santissima Annunziata Maggiore hospital, for abandoned young women who wished to enter religious life.

In 1687, Sabbatini moved to Rome in order to promote the Congregation of Pious Workers in the Papal States. From that point, Sabbatini involved himself in many benevolent activities with the poor and ill in hospitals and prisons, as well as aiding Jewish people. He continued working as a teacher, at the Collegio dei Catecumini, where he founded an academy of dogma and exegesis.

Returning to Naples in 1699, Sabbatini was elected general provost (Preposito Generale) of the Congregazione. For 25 years, he also directed the Congregazione dei Dottori e Cavalieri at San Giorgio Maggiore. He died in Naples.

== Veneration ==
Sabbatini's relics were believed to have healing properties.
