= Albert Ebert =

German painter

Albert Ebert (1906—1976) was a German painter.

Ebert was born in Halle. He studied for a mason and had miscellaneous jobs. In 1939, he was drafted to the army and eventually became a prisoner of war, and only released in 1945. After the release, he returned to Halle. In 1946, he studied for two semesters at Burg Giebichenstein Art School with Carl Crodel and Waldemar Grzimek. He later worked at the same school as a boilerman. Since 1956, Ebert was a freelance artist. His first personal exhibition was in 1957 in the pavilion of the Berliner Zeitung at Berlin Friedrichstraße station, all paintings were sold, including two to the National Gallery. In 1974, Gerhard Wolf published a book about Ebert, Albert Ebert. Wie ein Leben gemalt wird. Ebert died in 1976 in Halle. Six days before his death, a large retrospective exhibition of his work opened in the museum in the Moritzburg, but Ebert was already too ill to see it.

Ebert was interested in painting events and objects of everyday life. He also often included angels and devils in his paintings. As such, he did not fit to the narratives and forms spread by the East German state propaganda.

Ebert's paintings are in particular in collections of the Städel Museum in Frankfurt and the National Gallery in Berlin. The largest number of his works, 27 paintings, 12 drawings and all of his prints, are preserved in the Kunstmuseum Moritzburg Halle (Saale).

In 1964, Werner Kohlert, a film student at the German Academy of Film Art, asked Ebert for a permission to film the painter for his graduation project. In 1982, Kohlert colorized the originally black and white film and released it under the name "Der Maler Albert Ebert" ("The Painter Albert Ebert"). This 19-minutes long film is the only existing documentary on Ebert.

In 1992, a street in Halle (Albert-Ebert-Straße) was named after Ebert.
