= Tumult of Thorn (Toruń) =

Religious conflict in Royal Prussia in 1724

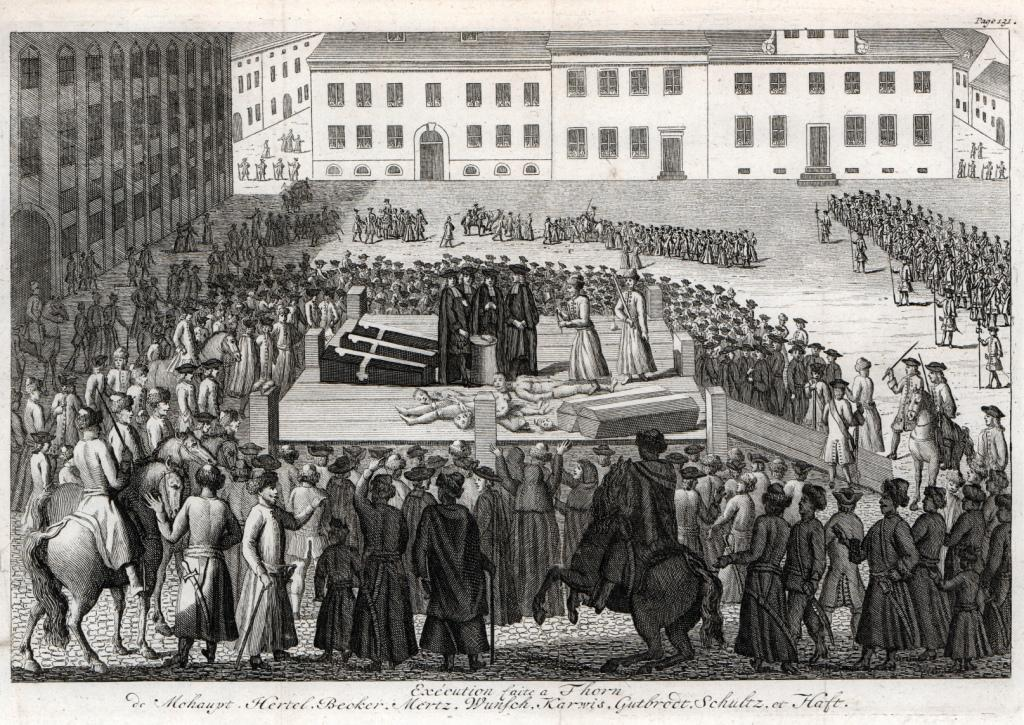
Executions at Thorn (Toruń)

The Tumult of Thorn (Toruń), or Blood-Bath of Thorn (Polish: Tumult toruński; German: Thorner Blutgericht, lit. 'Bloody court of Thorn') refers to executions ordered in 1724 by the Polish supreme court under Augustus II the Strong of Poland. During a religious conflict between Protestant townsfolk represented by mayor Johann Gottfried Rösner, and the Roman Catholic students of the Jesuit college in the city of Thorn (Toruń) in Royal Prussia, the college had been vandalised by a crowd of German Protestants. The mayor and nine other Lutheran officials were blamed for neglect of duty, sentenced to death, and executed on 7 December 1724.

== Historical background ==
The castle of Thorn (Toruń) was built by crusading German knights of the Teutonic Order, next to an existing Slavic town. In 1233, the town was granted Kulm law city rights. More settlers soon arrived with Franciscan and Dominican friars. In the 15th century, after becoming increasingly dissatisfied with the policy of the Order, citizens of the Order's monastic state organized themselves into the Prussian Confederation, and seceded in 1454 with the help of the Polish Crown. The resulting Thirteen Years' War ended in 1466 with the Second Peace of Thorn, in which the province of Royal Prussia was created and incorporated into the Kingdom of Poland.

After the secularization of the Teutonic Order, the newly formed Duchy of Prussia and the remaining Prussian territory adopted Lutheranism in 1525, the first state to do so. During the Protestant Reformation, the mostly German-populated Royal Prussia also adopted Protestantism in 1557, while the majority of the Kingdom of Poland remained Roman Catholic. During the tenure of mayor (Bürgermeister) Heinrich Stroband (1586–1609), the city became centralised and power passed into the hands of its city council.

At that time, Poland was largely tolerant in religious affairs. However, this gradually changed with the advent of the Counter-Reformation. In 1595, the Jesuits arrived to promote the Counter-Reformation, taking control of the Church of St John. Protestant city officials tried to limit the influx of a Catholic population into the city, as Catholics (Jesuits and Dominicans) already controlled most churches, leaving only St Mary's to the Protestant citizens.

In the second half of the 17th century, tensions between Catholics and Protestants grew. In 1645, a Colloquium Charitativum, a discussion between the leaders of the rival creeds, resulted in no agreement. Just as the religious tensions in the rest of Europe were settling down after the bloody Thirty Years' War and Peace of Westphalia, in the once very tolerant Polish–Lithuanian Commonwealth the situation was worsening. From 1682, St Mary's Church had to be guarded by a Lutheran Bürgerwehr (militia) during the Corpus Christi processions, as the assembled Catholics might have occupied this church as well. Further violent conflicts occurred in 1688 and 1721.

== 1724 Events ==
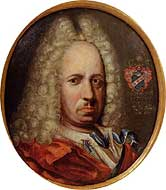
Johann Gottfried Rösner (21 November 1658 in Züllichau – 7 December 1724 in Thorn/Toruń), mayor of Thorn

On 16 and 17 July 1724, when the Jesuits held another procession, fights between pupils of the Jesuits and Lutheran inhabitants occurred as Jesuit pupils accused the gathered Lutherans of showing disrespect to Holy Mary by not taking their hats off during the procession and not kneeling before her statue. In the following argument, a Catholic student named Stanisław Lisiecki was arrested by Lutheran militia. In response, pupils of the Jesuits dragged a pupil named Jan Nagórny of the Lutheran Gymnasium into their monastery, demanding that Lisiecki be released. After a crowd assembled in front of the monastery to demand Nagórny's release. Johann Gottfried Rösner, who in that year served as president of the town council, ordered the town militia to dissolve the angry mob, but the commander disobeyed, as did the "citizen guards". Only the "crown guards", loyal to the king, could eventually pacify the scene, yet only after the crowd had entered the Jesuit building, causing damage.

Several Jesuits were beaten, portraits of Catholic saints were defiled, and the main altar was partially destroyed. Afterwards many books and paintings were thrown out into a pile and set on fire. After this event, both Jesuits and Dominicans tried to persuade Rösner and ten other leading citizens, all of them German Protestants, to convert to Roman Catholicism. They refused and remained in the city despite the pressure applied when the Jesuits sued them at the royal supreme court in Warsaw. The court was held during the second monarchy of August II the Strong in the era of the Silent Sejm, a time in which the Russian Empire dictated Polish internal policy. August, a former Lutheran who had been required to convert to Roman Catholicism in order to be elected to the Polish throne, regretted not being in a position to pardon the convicts.

Rösner and twelve other Lutherans were sentenced to death on 16 November. Prince Jerzy Dominik Lubomirski led a regiment of soldiers to the city to execute the verdict. Rösner and other officials were to be decapitated for "neglecting their duty and countenancing tumult", while two others, accused of profaning the Virgin, were to be quartered, and burned.

One of the convicts converted to Roman Catholicism and was spared, as was Rösner's predecessor and proxy, Jakob Heinrich Zerneke (1672–1741), a well-respected historian who had written the Chronica Thornica in 1711. He received an amnesty on 12 December and emigrated to Danzig (Gdańsk).

The last remaining Protestant church, St Mary's, was made Catholic and given to Franciscan friars who celebrated a mass there on the day of the execution, 7 December 1724, a date which is now observed in remembrance of the Protestant martyrs. In addition, the majority of the town council was required to be Catholic from then on. A Protestant school, chapel, and printing press were required to be handed over to Catholic control.

== Aftermath ==
The event was used by what Karin Friedrich calls "Brandenburg-Prussia's efficient propaganda machine", as an example of Polish and Catholic intolerance, even in German states which engaged in religious persecution themselves. In large parts of Protestant Europe, the event damaged Poland's reputation for religious tolerance.

Whether the terms 'tumult' or 'blood-bath' are used depends on national prejudice. German historians point out that the events played a role in the process of alienating the German population of Royal Prussia from the Polish Crown and Polish culture.

Over 165 contemporary publications and hundreds of newspapers reported on the alleged oppression of Protestants in Thorn. Decades later, during the Partitions of Poland, Voltaire recalled the sentencing of Protestants as an example "of the religious intolerance of the Poles" and glorified the Russian army.

In Polish history books, the event rarely found mention before 1979. Norman Davies states that it was the sole event for which the name of Copernicus's birthplace was remembered in Protestant Europe.
