= Johann Conrad Amman (1724–1811) =

Swiss physician, naturalist, and collector

Johann Conrad Ammann (December 24, 1724 in Schaffhausen – October 11, 1811 in Schaffhausen) was a Swiss physician, naturalist, and collector.

After graduating at Leiden in 1749 he began to practise at Schaffhausen. He was particularly noted for his collection of fossils.

He is often confused with Johann Konrad Ammann, born 1669 in Schaffhausen and died 1724 in Warmoud near Leiden.
