= Dietmar Eisold =

German journalist and art historian

Dietmar Eisold (18 September 1947 – 26 May 2017) was a German journalist and art historian.

== Life ==
Born in Leipzig, Eisold completed a Berufsausbildung mit Abitur as bricklayer until 1966. He then studied art education and history.

From 1971 to 1991, Eisold was editor for the area of fine arts at the newspaper Neues Deutschland, the Zentralorgan of the Sozialistische Einheitspartei Deutschlands (SED). He was a member of the Verband Bildender Künstler der DDR and its executive committee, where he appears as co-author of the accountability report of the central executive committee in 1988.

After the Peaceful Revolution, he concentrated his activity as an author and editor on lexicographical documentation of visual art and artists of the GDR.

Eisold died in Berlin at the age of 69.

== Publications ==
- Das Denkmalsensemble für das Marx-Engels-Forum. In Bildende Kunst, Nr. 3, 1986, pp. 104–108
- Lexikon Kunst der DDR. Vol. 1, Homilius, Berlin 2008, ISBN 978-3-89706-848-3.
- Lexikon Kunst der DDR. Vol., Homilius, Berlin 2008, ISBN 978-3-89706-847-6.
- Lexikon Künstler in der DDR – ein Projekt der Gesellschaft zum Schutz von Bürgerrecht und Menschenwürde e.V. Neues Leben, Berlin 2010, ISBN 978-3-355-01761-9.
