= Les Ascott =

Canadian football player

No. 52
- Positions: Offensive tackle, Offensive guard, Defensive tackle

Personal information
- Born: October 2, 1921; Peterborough, Ontario, Canada
- Died: August 8, 2013 (aged 91); Peterborough, Ontario, Canada

Career history
- 1940–1941: Toronto Argonauts
- 1942: Toronto Navy Bulldogs
- 1943: Halifax Navy
- 1944: Toronto Navy Bulldogs
- 1945–1953: Toronto Argonauts

Awards and highlights
- 5× Grey Cup champion (1945, 1946, 1947, 1950, 1952)

Leslie Ascott (October 2, 1921 – August 8, 2013) was a professional football player with the Canadian Football League Toronto Argonauts for 11 seasons. Ascott primarily played the offensive tackle position with the Argos and was a part of five Grey Cup championship teams.

In 1981 Ascott was inducted into the Peterborough Sports Hall of Fame.

In a 2004 ceremony at Rogers Centre, Ascott's jersey number 52 was retired and his name was added to the Argonauts' Wall of Honour.

Ascott lived in Peterborough, with his wife of 50 years, Irene. He had two children, Terry and Barbara, and three granddaughters. He died August 8, 2013, in his hometown.
