= Bill Zock =

Canadian football player

No. 62
- Position: Guard

Personal information
- Born: January 26, 1918; Toronto, Ontario, Canada
- Died: April 29, 1988 (aged 70); Toronto, Ontario, Canada
- Listed height: 6 ft 1 in (1.85 m)
- Listed weight: 232 lb (105 kg)

Career history
- 1937–1941: Toronto Argonauts
- 1942–1944: Toronto Balmy Beach Beachers
- 1945–1949: Toronto Argonauts
- 1951–1954: Edmonton Eskimos

Awards and highlights
- 6× Grey Cup champion (1937, 1938, 1945, 1946, 1947, 1954); 2× CFL East All-Star (1946, 1947)
- Canadian Football Hall of Fame (Class of 1985)

William Zock (January 26, 1918 – April 29, 1988) was a Canadian professional football offensive lineman. He played for the Toronto Argonauts and the Edmonton Eskimos in the Canadian Football League (CFL) from 1937 to 1954. He was part of five Grey Cup championships with the Argonauts and another one with the Eskimos. He was inducted into the Canadian Football Hall of Fame in 1985.
