= Royal Copeland (Canadian football) =

Canadian football player

Profile
- Position: Running back

Personal information
- Born: October 12, 1924; North Bay, Ontario, Canada
- Died: August 8, 2011 (aged 86); Toronto, Ontario, Canada

Career information
- High school: Humberside (Toronto)

Career history
- 1943–1944: Toronto HMCS York Bulldogs
- 1945–1949: Toronto Argonauts
- 1950–1951: Calgary Stampeders
- 1952–1956: Toronto Argonauts

Awards and highlights
- 4× Grey Cup champion (1945, 1946, 1947, 1952); Jeff Russel Memorial Trophy (1949); 6× CFL All-Star (1943, 1945, 1946, 1947, 1949, 1950)
- Canadian Football Hall of Fame (Class of 1988)

Royal Copeland (October 12, 1924 – August 8, 2011) was a Canadian football running back who played at the elite level from 1943 to 1956.

Copeland won four Grey Cups with the Toronto Argonauts. Along with Joe Krol they were known as the Gold Dust Twins. Copeland is the only player to score a touchdown in three consecutive Grey Cup games: 1945, 1946, and 1947. He became a member of the Canadian Football Hall of Fame in 1988.

During the Second World War when the Argonaut football operations were suspended, Royal Copeland played in the Ontario Rugby Football Union (ORFU) in 1943 with Toronto Navy HMCS York.
