= Nykoluk =

Nykoluk is a Ukrainian surname (Ukrainian: Ніколюк). Notable people with the surname include:

- Danny Nykoluk (1933–2016), Canadian football player
- Mike Nykoluk (1934–2022), Canadian ice hockey player
