= Toronto Argonauts =

Canadian football team based in Toronto, Canada

- Current season
- Logo
- Uniforms

General information
- Founded: October 4, 1873; 153 years ago
- Stadium: BMO Field
- Headquartered: Toronto, Ontario, Canada
- Colours: Cambridge Blue, Oxford Blue
- Mascot: Jason the Argonaut
- Website: argonauts.ca

Personnel
- Owner: Maple Leaf Sports & Entertainment
- General manager: Pinball Clemons
- Head coach: Mike Miller

Nicknames
- Argos, Boatmen, Double Blue, Scullers, Love Boat

Home fields
- Rosedale Field (1874–1897, 1908–1915); Varsity Stadium (1898–1907, 1916–1958); CNE Stadium (1959–1988); Rogers Centre (1989–2015); BMO Field (2016–present)

League / conference affiliations
- Canadian Football League: East Division

Championships
- Grey Cup wins: 19 (1914, 1921, 1933, 1937, 1938, 1945, 1946, 1947, 1950, 1952, 1983, 1991, 1996, 1997, 2004, 2012, 2017, 2022, 2024)

The Toronto Argonauts (officially the Toronto Argonaut Football Club and colloquially known as the Argos) are a professional Canadian football team based in Toronto. The Argonauts compete in the East Division of the Canadian Football League (CFL). Founded in 1873, the team is the oldest professional sports team in North America still using its original name, as well as the oldest-surviving team in both the modern-day CFL and East Division. The team's origins date back to a modified version of rugby football that emerged in North America in the latter half of the 19th century. The Argonauts played their home games at Rogers Centre (originally known as SkyDome) from 1989 until 2016, when the team moved to BMO Field, the fifth stadium site (on the footprint of their third home Exhibition Stadium) to host the team.

The Argonauts have won the Grey Cup a record 19 times and have appeared in the final 25 times. Most recently, they defeated the Winnipeg Blue Bombers 41–24 in the 111th Grey Cup in 2024. The Argonauts hold the best winning percentage in the championship game (.760) and have the longest active winning streak in games in which they have appeared, at eight. The Argonauts have faced every current western CFL team at least once in the Grey Cup, while their most celebrated divisional rivalry has been with the Hamilton Tiger-Cats.

The team was founded and owned by the Argonaut Rowing Club for its first 83 years, and has been owned by a series of business interests since 1956. The Argonauts were a fixture on the Toronto sports scene for decades, with attendance peaking in the 1970s. In May 2015, a consortium of Maple Leaf Sports & Entertainment's Larry Tanenbaum (via the Kilmer Group) and Bell Canada reached an agreement to acquire the team. The sale included a scheduled move to the MLSE-run BMO Field for the 2016 season, which had long been proposed given poor attendance at Rogers Centre. MLSE announced in December 2017 that it had agreed to purchase the team outright, with the deal finalized on January 19, 2018. The previous owners continue to indirectly own stakes in the Argos, as Bell Canada and the Kilmer Group respectively hold 37.5% and 25% stakes in MLSE.

Given the length of franchise history, dozens of players, coaches, and management have been honoured in some form over the years. The team recognizes a select group of players with retired numbers - early greats Joe Krol and Dick Shatto, stalwart offensive lineman Danny Nykoluk, and Michael "Pinball" Clemons, who has been the most recent face of the team.

== Name and colours ==
Since the team's foundation in 1873, the Argonauts name has been in continuous use, a record in North American professional sports. The Atlanta Braves (1871) franchise of Major League Baseball is older, but has changed their name and city more than once. The Argonauts are the oldest professional football team in North America.

The name "Argonauts" is derived from Greek mythology: according to legend, Jason and the Argonauts were a group of heroes who set out to find the Golden Fleece aboard the ship Argo sometime before the Trojan War. Given its nautical theme, the name Argonaut was adopted by a group of amateur rowers in Toronto in 1872. The Argonaut Rowing Club, which still exists today, went on to found the football club with the same name a year later. Given their roots in a rowing squad, the team is often referred to as "the Boatmen" and less often "the Scullers".

In the 19th century, the most renowned rowing teams in the world were from the University of Oxford and the University of Cambridge in England. The Toronto rowers, many of whom had associations with the English schools, adopted uniforms incorporating the light blue of Cambridge and the dark blue of Oxford. In turn, the footballers adopted the colours and the phrase "double blue" became synonymous with the team. (Note: The team continues to refer to their colours as Oxford blue and Cambridge blue for historical reasons rather than strict colour accuracy. While they have retained the very dark blue associated with Oxford, the light blue of the modern uniforms is close to azure. Cambridge blue is technically a shade of spring green and appears somewhat grayish.) Blue has become the traditional colour of top-level teams in Toronto, such as the Toronto Maple Leafs and Toronto Blue Jays.

The team's other official colour is white. Its current helmet design features a Cambridge blue background, with the team logo featuring a boat incorporating a football.

== History ==
=== 1873–1906 ===
"On Sunday afternoon a game of foot ball, Rugby rules, was played on the University ground, between the Argonauts, of Toronto, and the Hamilton club. After a most exciting contest, one goal was secured at five o'clock by the Toronto men, the ball being kicked through the Hamilton flags by Buchanan."

— The Toronto Mail, October 20, 1873

The first recorded game of what would become known as Canadian football was played in Toronto on November 9, 1861, featuring University of Toronto students. At the time, the game was a modified version of English rugby, which gained popularity throughout the 1860s. Rugby itself was still an infant game having evolved out of association football (soccer) in the 1830s. Seeking a way to keep fit after summer, the Argonaut Rowing Club (ARC) formed their own rugby-football squad on October 4, 1873. The Argonauts Football Club played their first game against Hamilton on October 18 of that year (a victory), beginning a storied rivalry. (Note: Confusion remains over the first Argos match. The CFL continues to report that a game took place on October 11 against the University of Toronto. Citing the "definitive" research of Ian Speers, O'Leary and Parrish refute this and point to the 18th as the first date. The fact that the Hamilton game was played on the grounds of U of T may have led to a later journalistic error.) H.T. Glazebrook was their first captain and head coach. Establishment of the football team was formalized by the ARC on September 17, 1874, with a subscription fee of one dollar charged per player.

The football team played a handful of challenge matches—one team inviting another to play—as an amateur squad against university and city teams every year throughout the 1870s, with one dormant year in 1879, likely due to injuries. In 1883 the Toronto Football Club, other city teams from Ontario and university squads from Toronto, Queens University and Royal Military College formed the Ontario Rugby Football Union (ORFU); it was the first rugby football organization with a league and playoff structure in North America. The Toronto Football Club were league victors in the first year. Starting in 1884, a "Dominion Championship"—a precursor to the Grey Cup—was held, pitting the victors of the country's two organized leagues, the ORFU and Quebec Rugby Football Union (QRFU), against each other; it was organized nationally by the Canadian Rugby Union (CRU) from 1892 onwards. In the first true national championship, the Montreal Football Club defeated the Toronto Football Club on November 6, 1884, by a score of 30–0. Argonauts lost the Dominion Title in 1901 to Ottawa College. The Ottawa Football Club and the Hamilton Football Club were frequent opponents in this era.

Over the thirty years from 1880 onwards, rule changes were incrementally introduced into the game, including the adoption of the line of scrimmage, scoring that began to resemble the modern version, and the down and yardage structure. Popular personalities of the era included player-coach Joe Wright Sr., one of the best all around Canadian athletes at the turn of the century. One major outstanding issue within the CRU at the time was the role of professional versus amateur players; this dispute caused the Argonauts to withdraw from the league in 1903 and eventually led to the establishment of a new league, The Big Four or Interprovincial Rugby Football League. Alongside the professionalism dispute, there was serious disagreement over the adoption of the Burnside rules, with Ontario, Quebec, and the intercollegiate league often not in alignment. Among other critical innovations, the Burnside rules reduced the number of men per side to 12 and introduced the ten yards in three downs structure that is central to the modern game.

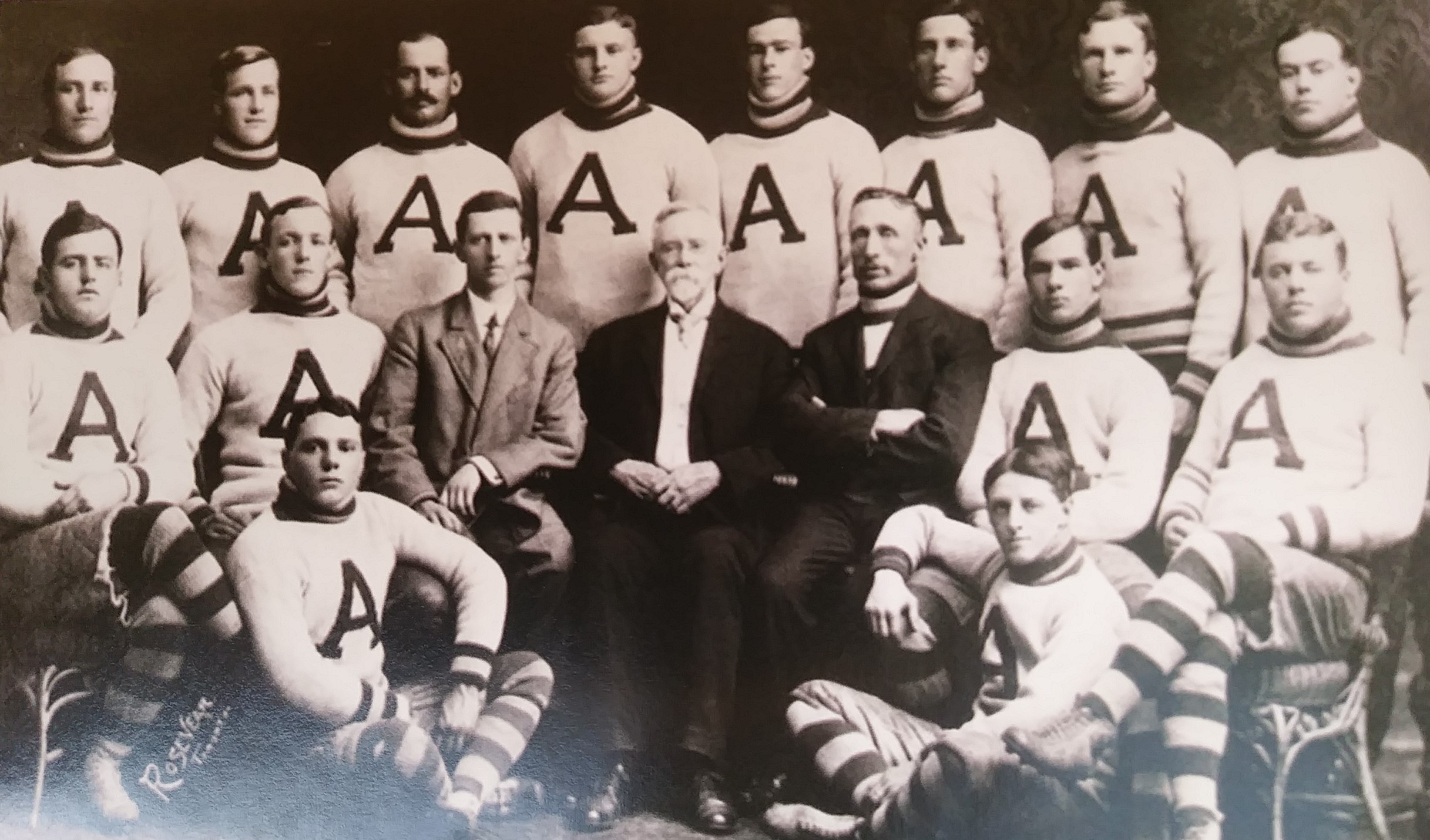
1906 Toronto Argonauts

The Argonauts merged with the Toronto Football Club in 1905, and W. A. Hewitt was manager of the Argonauts until 1907. He was also vice-president of the ORFU for the 1905 and 1906 seasons, and sought for ORFU to have uniform rules of play with the CRU, with a preference to use the snap-back system of play. When the CRU did not adopt the snap-back system, his motion was approved for the ORFU to adopt the CRU rules in 1906.

=== 1907–1952 ===
In December 1906, The Gazette reported that a proposal originated from Ottawa for the ORFU and the QRFU to merge, which would allow for higher calibre of play and create rivalries. Hewitt helped organize the meeting which established the Interprovincial Rugby Football Union (IRFU) in 1907. Seeking looser rules regarding the employment of professional players, Toronto and Hamilton split from the ORFU and joined Ottawa and Montreal of the QRFU in forming the IRFU, or "Big Four."

The IRFU continued under the larger auspices of the Canadian Rugby Union. Beginning in 1909, the CRU champion was awarded the Grey Cup, with the Big Four competing against university squads and eventually teams from Western Canada. The Argonauts first competed for the Cup in 1911, losing 14 to 7 to the University of Toronto in front of a then record 13,687 spectators at the newly opened Varsity Stadium. The team claimed their first championship in 1914, exacting revenge on U of T with a 14 to 2 victory. Their star runner and kicker in their first championship year was Jack O'Connor, who scored a league record 44 points.

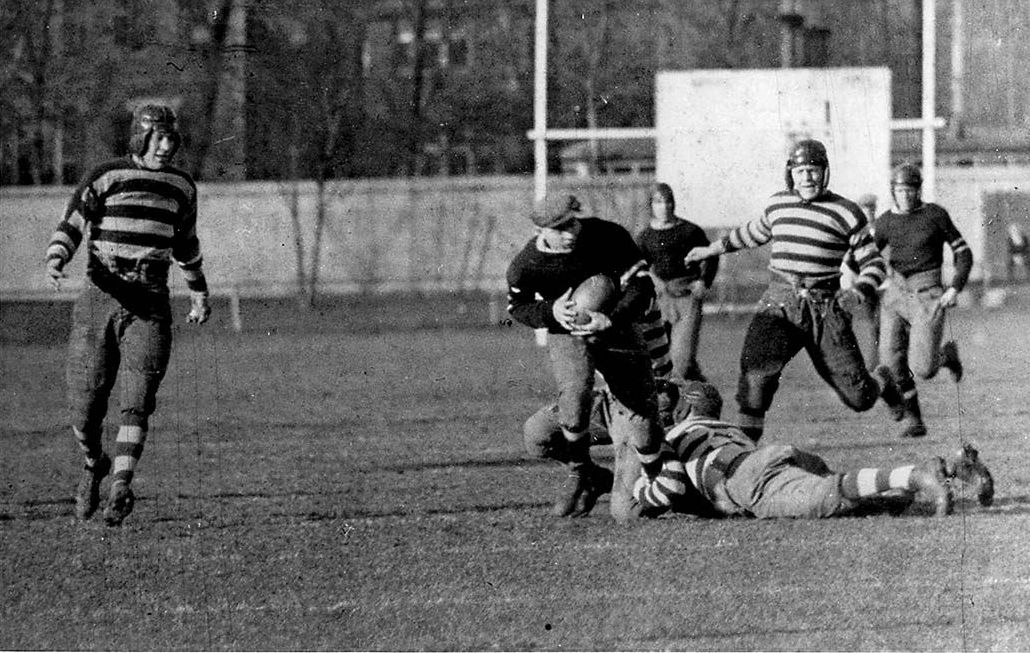
The Argonauts (in stripes) playing the Ottawa Rough Riders at Varsity Stadium in 1924

After play was halted during World War I, the Argos again achieved success in the early 1920s on the back of one Canada's greatest ever sportsmen. Lionel Conacher, the "Big Train", led the team to two perfect 6–0 seasons in 1921 and 1922. In the first season he accounted for 85 of his team's 167 points, and 15 of the points in the Grey Cup game, a 23–0 drubbing of the Edmonton Eskimos. It was the first east-west Grey Cup championship in Canadian history.

The 1921 Grey Cup victory was their last until 1933, at which point the Argonauts became the dominant team of an increasingly nationwide sport. They put together a number of Grey Cup dynasties in the 1930s and 1940s, winning eight of twenty Grey Cups between 1933 and 1952. The Winnipeg Blue Bombers were most often on the receiving end of Argo Grey Cup victories in this era. From 1933 to 1941 Lew Hayman coached the team with a still unparalleled winning ratio of 45–15–2. Their first back-to-back Grey Cups came in 1937 and 1938. This was also the era of the famed Stukus brothers—Annis, Bill, and Frank—who proved a potent all-purpose trio in the Argonauts' championship years.

Joe "King" Krol and Royal Copeland, the so-called 'Gold Dust Twins', were the best-known players of the 1940s. In an era where players still played multiple positions, they were a threat in every capacity: running, passing, catching, kicking, and playing defence. Often connecting with each other for points, they led the Argos to a Grey Cup threepeat between 1945 and 1947. In 1948, the team broke a cultural barrier with the signing of Ken Whitlock as not only their first import player in quite some time but also their first ever black player. Whitlock played only 4 games as a halfback & punter before getting released from the team, but his signing also ushered a new era for player acquisitions. 1949 and 1950 marked a watershed in Argonauts history as the team began large scale importation of American players for the first time. In 1950, the Argos signed their second ever black player after Whitlock, Ulysses "Crazy Legs" Curtis. Curtis played five strong years with the team as their featured running back.

Toronto Argonauts win Grey Cup 1950 in Mud Bowl Varsity Stadium

Frank Clair was brought in as coach in 1950 and left his mark on the revamped roster; he led the team to Grey Cup wins in 1950 and 1952. The first of these was a 13–0 victory over Winnipeg in the notorious Mud Bowl. A November snowstorm followed by mild conditions turned Varsity Stadium into a bog and the play was a shambles; one Winnipeg player is reported to have almost drowned in the muck.

At some time during this period, the phrase "Argo Bounce" came to refer to the Argonauts' propensity to receive a lucky bounce of the football. The phrase may date to the Grey Cups of the 1930s, all of which featured improbable bounces and fumbles favouring the Argos; the phrase was popularized in print by Annis Stukus in the 1940s. It is still in use today, with a number of fortunate on-field happenings attributed to the "bounce".

=== 1953–1988 ===
The three decades after the 1952 Grey Cup victory have been called the Argonauts' Dark Ages. A year after winning the Grey Cup, the Argos crashed to dead last in the Big Four. It was the start of a 31-year stretch without a Grey Cup, and for the first 19 of those years, they only got as far as the second round of the playoffs. Part of the reason was a salary cap introduced in 1953 that cost them many talented players. For the first time in decades, they were a fixture at or near the bottom of the East. The management style under new owner John W. H. Bassett has also been blamed: young talent was traded or allowed to leave and the team could not form a nucleus of championship players; coaches came and went rapidly. Two notable events occurred off-field at the end of the 1950s. In 1958 the Argonauts became a founding member of the Canadian Football League and a year later found a new home at Exhibition Stadium. (Note: The inaugural game at Exhibition Stadium was an inter-league match against the NFL's Chicago Cardinals. The Argos played two more exhibition games against NFL clubs in the next two years and were losers in all three. The games were part of a wider series of interleague match-ups between CFL and NFL teams held during this era.)

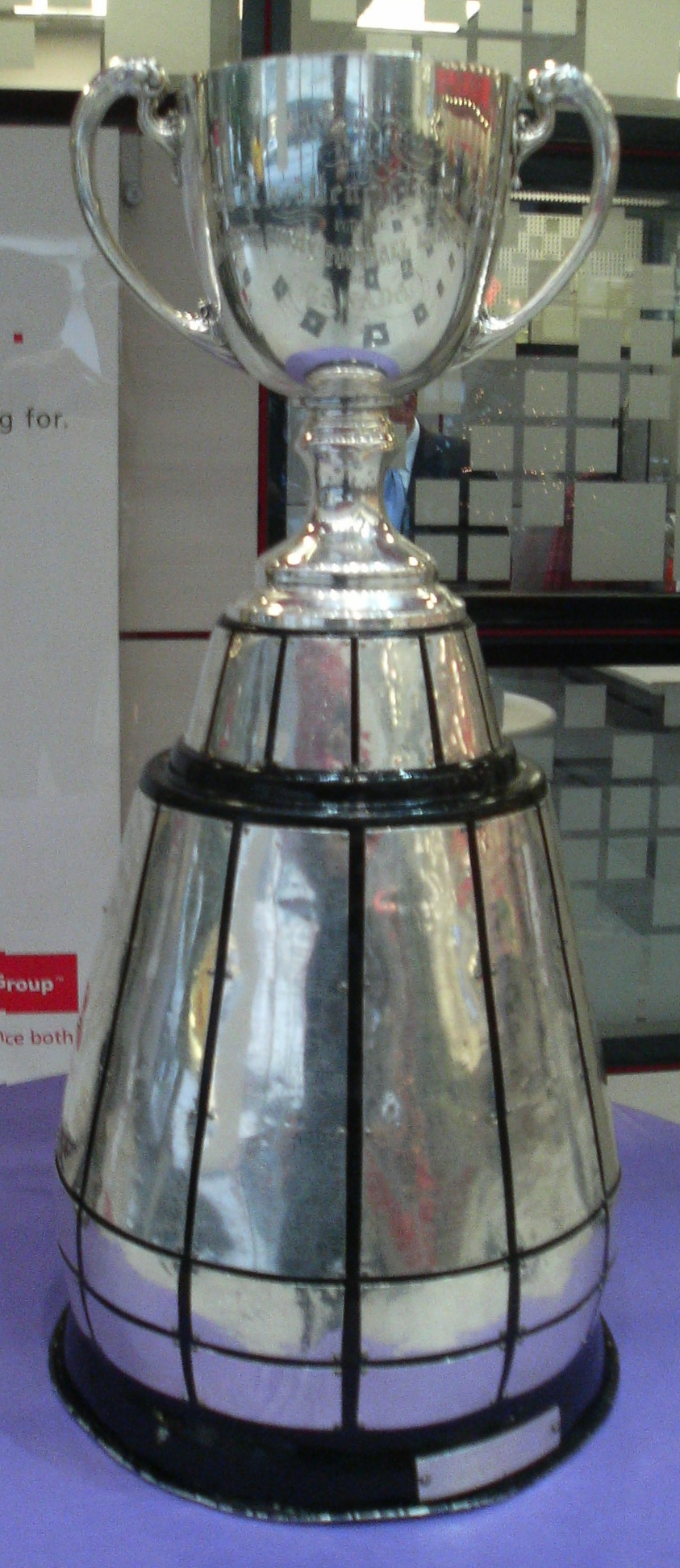
The Argonauts have won a record 19 Grey Cups, but suffered through a 31-year championship drought from 1952 to 1983.

The Argonauts did have some standout players in the 1950s and 1960s. The stalwart of the era was Dick Shatto, an Ohioan who played twelve seasons from 1954 to 1965. Listed as a running back, Shatto was a dual threat to run and receive and continues to hold the team regular season records for touchdowns (91) and total yards gained (6,958). Living in Toronto year round, Shatto set down deep roots in the city and eventually became the Argonauts' general manager. Another American, Tobin Rote, set numerous passing marks in three years at quarterback from 1960 to 1962. Known for his good living off the field, Rote still holds the Argos single game passing record with 524 yards against Montreal on August 19, 1960. A pillar on the offensive line was Danny Nykoluk at tackle, whose career spanned 17 seasons from 1954 to 1971, including one stretch of 12 years where he did not miss a single game. Despite the presence of these veterans, the era was marked by losing seasons and high attrition on the roster. By the 1960s, the annual (and often desperate) mid-season addition of American imports had become known as the "Argo airlift"; American imports often did not last a game before being cut.

Eventually, the team became competitive again under head coach Leo Cahill in the late 1960s. They scored a coup over the National Football League (NFL) with the signing of a young Joe Theismann (and other American stars) in 1971. The team also saw an attendance bounce, consistently selling out Exhibition Stadium. The Boatmen's best chance to end their Grey Cup drought came that year, when they faced the Calgary Stampeders in the 59th Grey Cup, the first to be played on artificial turf. In a defensive struggle at Vancouver's soggy Empire Stadium, a now infamous late fumble by Leon "X-Ray" McQuay and a possession-changing kick out of bounds by Harry Abofs sealed a 14–11 Stampeder victory.

Aside from 1971, the 1970s were tumultuous for the team, with numerous hirings and firings of head coaches and consistent losing records. There were stellar players over this era, including defensive all-stars such as Jim Stillwagon, Jim Corrigall, and Granville "Granny" Liggins, but the team could not return to winning form. High-profile moves such as hiring Canadian football icon Russ Jackson as head coach in 1975 or signing running back superstar Anthony Davis the next year turned into busts. Ironically, the Argos reached historic attendance highs in this losing decade—regular season average per game attendance reached 47,356 in 1976. The enlargement and reconfiguration of Exhibition Stadium over 1975 and 1976 in anticipation and preparation of the Blue Jays expansion baseball team (who began play in 1977) allowed for these massive crowds.

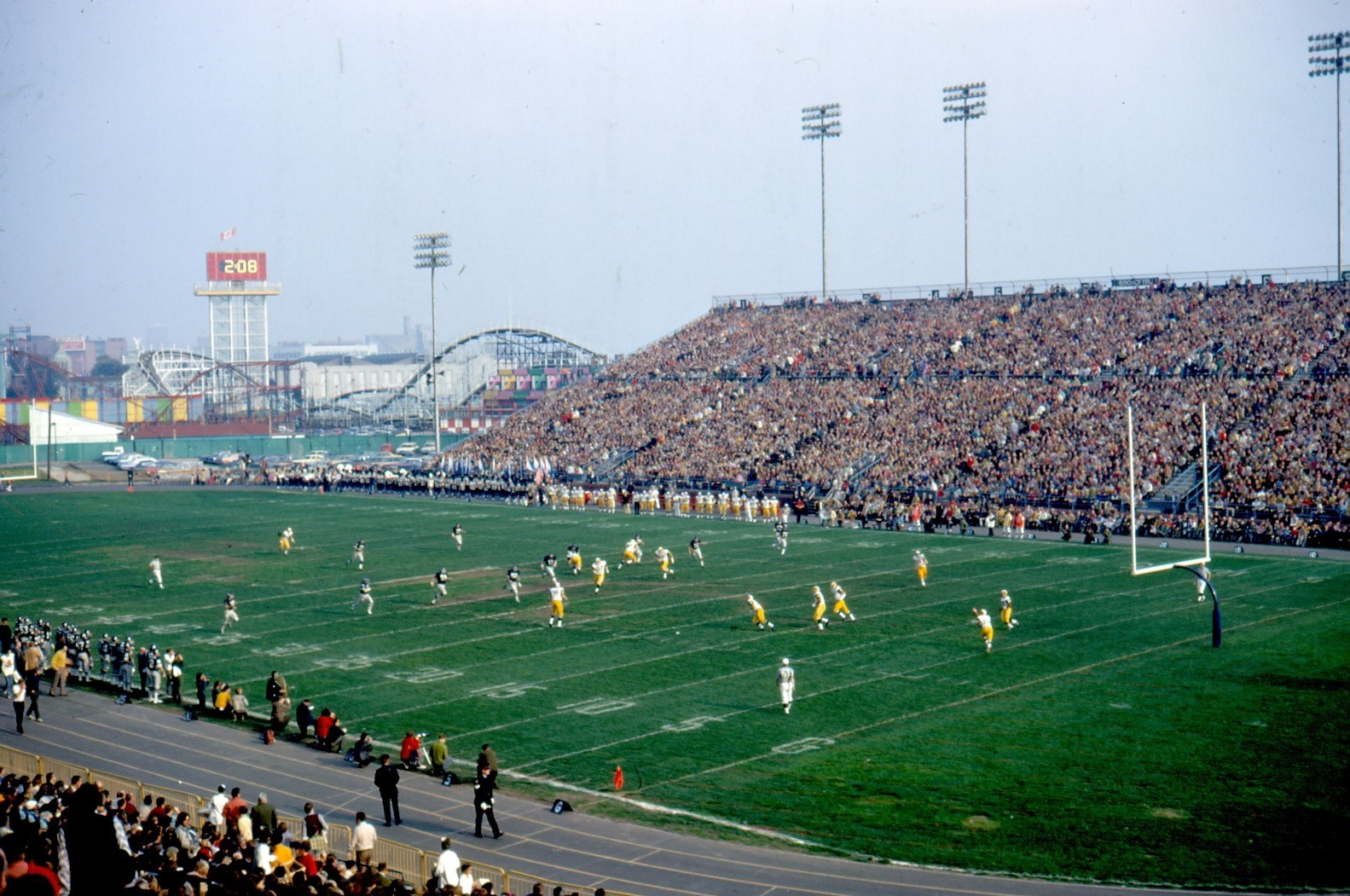
Argonauts vs Tiger-Cats at Exhibition Stadium in fall of 1971

The Argos reached an all-time low in 1981 when they finished 2–14; this despite having such talented players as quarterback Condredge Holloway, running back Cedric Minter, and receiver Terry Greer. The team began the year 0–10 and there was talk of a "perfect" losing season. The team had been inept so long by this point (29 seasons without a Grey Cup win) that the notion of an "Argo Bounce" had become inverted; now "it was the unluckiest bounce in the world, the one that usually arose from the Argos' uncanny ability to lose critical games in the dying minutes by committing an improbable blunder."

However, with the 1982 season came the hiring of Bob O'Billovich as head coach and Mouse Davis as offensive co-ordinator. Davis implemented the run and shoot offense, and the Argos enjoyed a turnaround, going 9–6–1 that year; Condredge Holloway was the CFL's most outstanding player. The team ultimately fell short in their quest for a Grey Cup, losing 32–16 in a driving rainstorm to the mighty Edmonton Eskimos (in the last of their five consecutive Grey Cup titles) in the final in front of a disappointed crowd at Exhibition Stadium. The 1983 season finally brought the championship home. The Argos finished 12–4 and Terry Greer set a CFL record with 2,003 receiving yards. Joe Barnes and Condredge Holloway were a potent duo at quarterback. The Double Blue returned to the Grey Cup, this time facing the BC Lions at BC Place Stadium in Vancouver. Despite the hostile crowd, Toronto defeated BC 18–17 to win their first Grey Cup since 1952. The Argos were generally competitive for the remainder of the 1980s, thanks in large part to talented players such as Gill "The Thrill" Fenerty and Darrell K. Smith, but a return to the glory of 1983 proved elusive (outside of an appearance in the 1987 Grey Cup game, in which they lost in the last minute to the Edmonton Eskimos 38–36).

=== 1989–2015 ===
The 1989 season saw the Argonauts move into SkyDome, a multi-purpose downtown stadium with a retractable roof. It marked the beginning of an eventful few years. In 1990, one of the most beloved figures in Toronto sporting history emerged on the team: Michael "Pinball" Clemons set a CFL record for all purpose yards with 3,300 in his first full year, a record he broke in 1997 with 3,840.

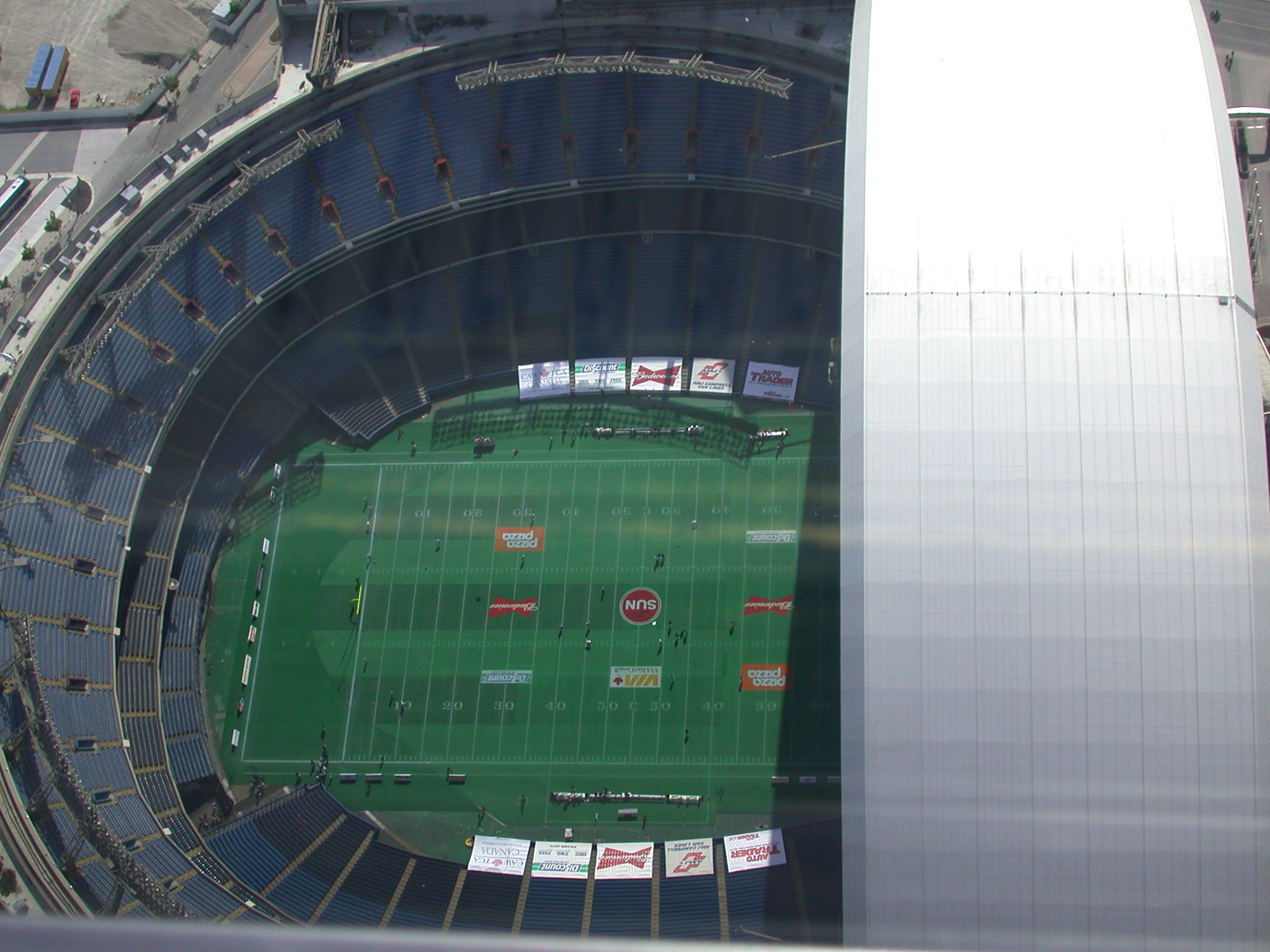
SkyDome set up for the Argonauts. The Argonauts played at SkyDome from 1989 to 2015.

In 1991 Hollywood prestige arrived in the form of a new ownership trio. Bruce McNall, owner of the NHL's Los Angeles Kings, bought the team. One of his players, hockey great Wayne Gretzky, became a minority owner, as did Canadian-born comedian John Candy. The group shocked the football world with the signing of Raghib "Rocket" Ismail; expected to be the first overall pick in the 1991 NFL draft out of Notre Dame, Ismail instead signed with the Argos on draft day for an unheard-of $18.2 million over four years. The rookie instantly became the highest-paid football player in North America, as at the time the richest contract in the NFL was Joe Montana's 4-year, $13 million deal. Ismail immediately impressed, particularly on kickoff returns, and was named player of the game in the 1991 Grey Cup, which the Argos won 36–21 over the Calgary Stampeders. Clemons and quarterback Matt Dunigan (who played the final with a broken collarbone) were the other critical pieces to the championship.

However, the Argos slumped to 6–12 only a year later, beginning a slide that only accelerated when Dunigan and Ismail left after the season. The 1992 season was the first of four consecutive losing seasons; while they made the playoffs in 1994, they were promptly eliminated by the Baltimore Stallions in the division semi-finals. Trouble also struck off the field. McNall put the team on the market in 1993 citing massive losses and the strain of being an absentee owner. Labatt Brewing Company, parent of league broadcast partner The Sports Network, bought the team in May 1994. The sale would have closed sooner if not for Candy's death in March. McNall would have likely had to sell the team in any event; he confessed to conspiracy and fraud later that year.

Attendance also began to slide in the mid-1990s, raising questions over the team's viability that persist to this day. The per game average was just above 16,000 in 1994 and 1995, much less than half the team's 1970s peak.

The University of Toronto's Mississauga campus (then known as Erindale College) became the team's practice location in 1996.

Championship material did eventually reemerge in 1996. The team hired Don Matthews, who was fresh off a Grey Cup victory with the Baltimore Stallions to be the team's new head coach and signed Doug Flutie, one of the greatest quarterbacks in CFL history, to a contract and surrounded him with key personnel. The team included linebacker Mike O'Shea, veteran wide receiver Paul Masotti, and running back Robert Drummond. Derrell "Mookie" Mitchell was added at receiver in 1997. The Boatmen took the Grey Cup in both 1996 and 1997. Flutie set team records for single season passing yards with more than 5,500 in each year and for touchdowns thrown with 47 in 1997 (one less than his CFL record of 48) before crossing the border to join the Buffalo Bills the next year. Masotti retired in 1999 as the team's all time pass reception yardage leader. Clemons ended his own successful career in 2000 before returning to coach in 2000 and 2001 to 2007.

The years after their back-to-back championships saw a return to mediocrity for the Argos. Ticket sales remained flat, and there were changes in ownership. Gimmicks to attract fans were greeted with criticism. The Argos seemingly bottomed out in July 2003 when the CFL stripped control over the team from owner Sherwood Schwarz. The team had amassed debts of over $20 million, including $17.4 owed to Schwarz himself.

New ownership under David Cynamon and Howard Sokolowski brought immediate dividends with another Grey Cup win in 2004. Veteran Damon Allen led the team to a 27–19 victory over the B.C. Lions, with Jon Avery a critical running threat. Allen continued with the team until 2007, and retired with professional football's all-time leading passing yardage (72,381).

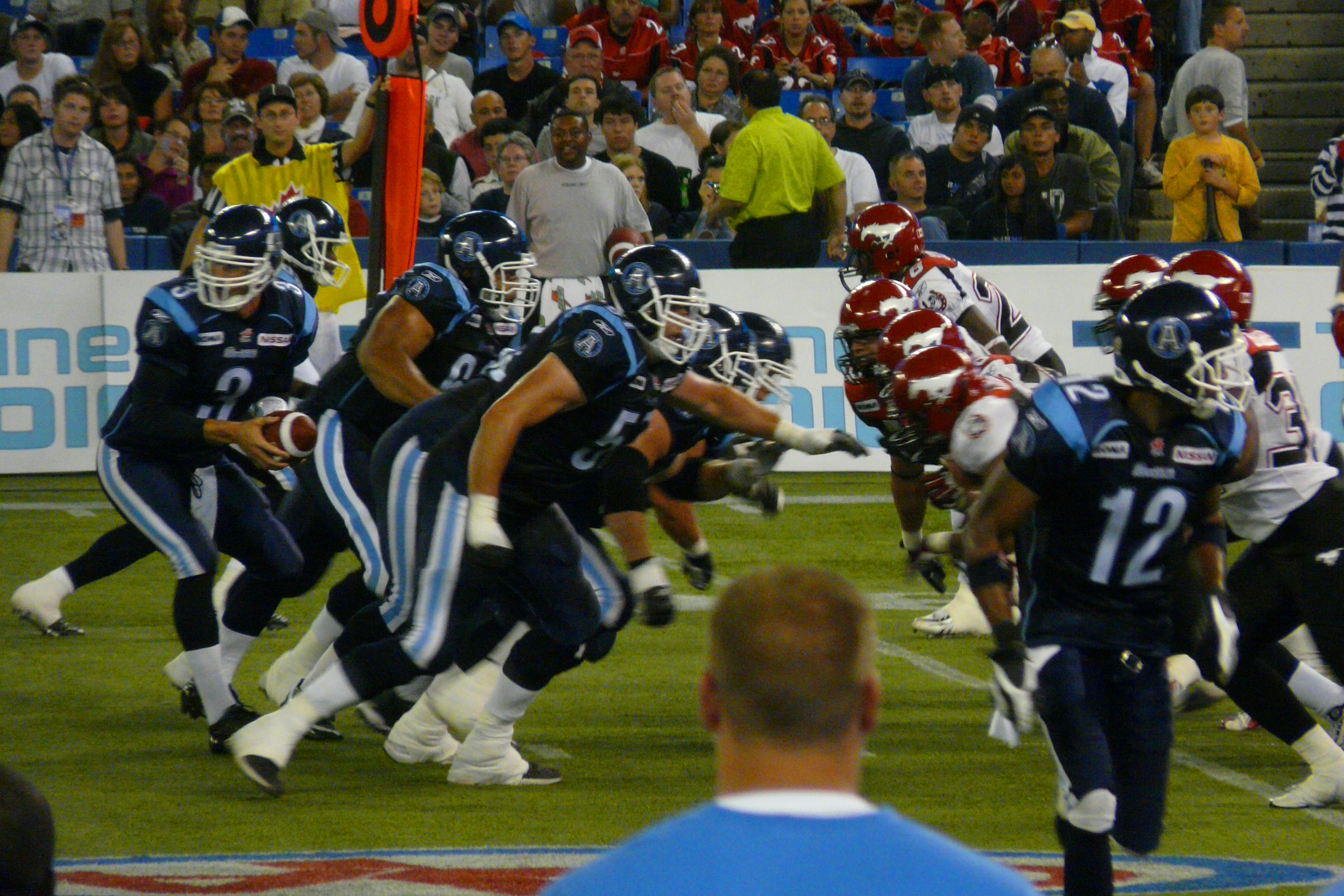
The Argonauts during a game against the Calgary Stampeders, during the 2008 CFL season

The Argonauts saw winning seasons from 2005 to 2007 before bottoming out the next two years. They finished 2009 with just three wins. Critical players over this half-decade included receiver Arland Bruce III, defensive star Byron Parker, and all-star punter Noel Prefontaine. The team generated some controversy in 2006 when they lured running back Ricky Williams from the NFL. Williams had repeatedly violated NFL drug policies and was under suspension for the year; he played just one season with the Argos.

In 2010 the team again saw an ownership change, with construction magnate David Braley, who also owns the Lions, taking control. After breaking even in 2010 and going 6–12 in 2011, the Argonauts again acquired a championship nucleus in 2012. Ricky Ray was brilliant at quarterback while Chad Owens emerged as arguably the league's best special teams player. Owens broke Michael Clemons CFL record for all purpose yards and won the CFL Most Outstanding Player award that year. The 2012 Grey Cup was played in Toronto and the team took their first championship victory in the city since 1952, a 35–22 win over Calgary.

The team's practice location was moved to York University in June 2014, after it had previously been at the University of Toronto Mississauga for 18 years.

=== 2016–present ===
After years of being run on a shoestring budget by owner David Braley and facing the prospect of being evicted out of its longtime home, Braley sold the club to a consortium, led by Maple Leaf Sports & Entertainment chairman Larry Tanenbaum and BCE Inc, a move that solidified the franchise's long-term future.

The Argos moved out of Rogers Centre and into BMO Field for the 2016 season. Despite the initial hype of playing at a fan-friendly outdoor facility, the club finished at the bottom of the standings with a 5–13 record. A front office purge followed, with the firing of general manager Jim Barker on January 24, 2017. Head coach Scott Milanovich, who was facing an uncertain future with the Argos in the wake of Barker's firing, quit four days later, accepting the quarterbacks coach position for the Jacksonville Jaguars under Doug Marrone.

Looking to start afresh both on and off the field, the Argos hired former Montreal Alouettes general manager Jim Popp and head coach Marc Trestman on February 28, 2017. Popp and Trestman won consecutive Grey Cup championships in 2009 and 2010. Popp, the architect of the Alouettes' resurgence in the Montreal sports scene, acquired some of his former players, such as S. J. Green and Bear Woods.

In August 2017, the team moved their practice facility to the former Don Bosco Catholic Secondary School, with a short-term lease of the facility from the Toronto Catholic District School Board.

Despite assembling the roster and coaching staff on short notice, the team finished the 2017 season with a 9–9 record, placing first in the East Division. After defeating Saskatchewan 25–21 in the Division Final, Toronto won the 17th Grey Cup in their franchise history, defeating Calgary 27–24.

In 2018, the team's new owners Maple Leaf Sports & Entertainment moved the team's practice facility to the nearby MLSE managed Lamport Stadium with the football operations staff moving to BMO Field and the nearby MLSE managed Coca-Cola Coliseum.

Since 2015, the team has averaged the lowest home attendance in the CFL every year, their lowest average (in a non-pandemic affected year) being 12,431 in 2015. Despite that, the Argonauts won their 18th Grey Cup championship in team history in 2022, hanging on to defeat the Winnipeg Blue Bombers, 24–23, and in 2024 they again defeated Winnipeg by a score of 41–24 to capture their second Grey Cup championship in three seasons and continuing their streak of winning their last eight Grey Cup appearances, dating back to 1987.

== Championship summary ==
Date	Grey Cup	W/L	Opponent	Score	Host city	Victory #
November 17, 2024	111th	W	Winnipeg Blue Bombers	41–24	Vancouver	19
November 20, 2022	109th	W	Winnipeg Blue Bombers	24–23	Regina	18
November 26, 2017	105th	W	Calgary Stampeders	27–24	Ottawa	17
November 25, 2012	100th	W	Calgary Stampeders	35–22	Toronto	16
November 21, 2004	92nd	W	BC Lions	27–19	Ottawa	15
November 16, 1997	85th	W	Saskatchewan Roughriders	47–23	Edmonton	14
November 24, 1996	84th	W	Edmonton Eskimos	43–37	Hamilton	13
November 24, 1991	79th	W	Calgary Stampeders	36–21	Winnipeg	12
November 29, 1987	75th	L	Edmonton Eskimos	38–36	Vancouver	–
November 27, 1983	71st	W	BC Lions	18–17	Vancouver	11
November 28, 1982	70th	L	Edmonton Eskimos	32–16	Toronto	–
November 28, 1971	59th	L	Calgary Stampeders	14–11	Vancouver	–
November 29, 1952	40th	W	Edmonton Eskimos	21–14	Toronto	10
November 25, 1950	38th	W	Winnipeg Blue Bombers	13–0	Toronto	9
November 29, 1947	35th	W	Winnipeg Blue Bombers	10–9	Toronto	8
November 30, 1946	34th	W	Winnipeg Blue Bombers	28–6	Toronto	7
December 1, 1945	33rd	W	Winnipeg Blue Bombers	35–0	Toronto	6
December 10, 1938	26th	W	Winnipeg Blue Bombers	30–7	Toronto	5
December 11, 1937	25th	W	Winnipeg Blue Bombers	4–3	Toronto	4
December 9, 1933	21st	W	Sarnia Imperials	4–3	Sarnia	3
December 3, 1921	9th	W	Edmonton Eskimos	23–0	Toronto	2
December 4, 1920	8th	L	University of Toronto	16–3	Toronto	–
December 5, 1914	6th	W	University of Toronto	14–2	Toronto	1
November 30, 1912	4th	L	Hamilton Alerts	11–4	Hamilton	–
November 25, 1911	3rd	L	University of Toronto	14–7	Toronto	–

The Toronto Argonauts currently lead the CFL in total wins and in winning percentage in the Grey Cup. Early success in the final can partly be attributed to the weakness of western teams: between 1921 and 1952 the Argonauts won in nine straight appearances, including six straight against the Winnipeg Blue Bombers. The team's success is not merely a historical aberration, however: they have won nine of their 12 appearances since the formation of the CFL, including their last eight straight.

For the entire Grey Cup era some form of playoffs has led up to the Grey Cup game; the 24 Argonauts teams who have won a spot in the final would, in modern terms, be called "Eastern Division Champions". However, the route to the Grey Cup, participating teams, and playoff format have changed repeatedly over time. During the years that they competed in the Interprovincial Rugby Football Union (1907–1957) the Argonauts won the James Dixon Trophy (awarded to the IRFU playoff champion) 14 times, going on to win the Grey Cup on 10 of these occasions. The Argonauts, in the CFL era (since 1958), hold a 7–3 record in the Grey Cup title, despite not winning their first Grey Cup as a CFL team until 1983.

As for the regular season, the CFL records 14 Argonauts teams at the top of the eastern divisional table since its formation in 1958. Earlier data for the Interprovincial Rugby Football Union provides another 9 years from 1907 to 1957 in which the Argos were the best of the "Big Four", for a total of 23 divisional wins. The only pre-1958 year in which the Argos won the IRFU but failed to make a Grey Cup appearance was 1922, when they lost in the Eastern Canada final to Queen's University.

Going back to an even earlier era, the Argonauts won the Ontario Rugby Football Union championship three times between 1883 and 1906, including the league's first two seasons, 1883 and 1884. Their last victory as ORFU members came in 1901. Given their losses in the Dominion Championship in 1884 and 1901, the Argonauts did not earn the title "national champion" until their first Grey Cup win in 1914.

== Stadiums ==
Toronto Argonauts stadiums
Stadium	Tenure
Rosedale Field	1874–1897; 1908–1915
Varsity Stadium	1898–1907; 1916–1958
CNE Stadium	1959–1988
Rogers Centre	1989–2015
BMO Field	2016–present

The Toronto Argonauts' first home was Rosedale Field at Mount Pleasant Road and MacLennan Avenue near the city centre. The team suggests its capacity was 10,000 total with 4,000 seated, though O'Leary and Parrish list smaller numbers, noting that a $32,000 renovation in 1883 allowed for a capacity of 2,000. The field has historic significance as the site of the first Grey Cup game in 1909; the CFL lists the game's attendance as 3,807. The field still exists as part of Rosedale Park, although there are no grandstands.

Sources again differ on when the team permanently moved to Varsity Stadium on the grounds of the University of Toronto. The team gives dates of 1874–1897 and 1908–1915 at Rosedale, while other sources suggest the team had moved to Varsity by 1911. (Note: Details available from the team are contradictory: they suggest a 1916 move to Varsity in their Stadium History but 1911 in their Year-By-Year History. In his write-up on Varsity Stadium, Speers agrees with the 1911 date. There is no dispute that the stadium was completed in late 1911 and that the Argonauts participated in the Grey Cup at the venue that year.) Varsity became indelibly linked with the Argonauts and the early years of Canadian football; it was the home field of the great Argo dynasties of the 1930s and 1940s. For most of the Argos time at the stadium, its capacity was about 16,000, but this jumped above 20,000 with a renovation in 1950. Although it has not hosted a professional game since 1958, it still holds the record for hosting the most Grey Cups with 30.

Another home beckoned in 1959 with the renovation of the new Exhibition Stadium (also called CNE Stadium) to accommodate Canadian football. Often remembered ruefully by Torontonians for its exposure to weather, as well as poor sightlines after it was converted in the 1970s to additionally accommodate baseball, the stadium was nevertheless the site of the Argos' greatest attendance in the late 1960s and 1970s. Particularly brutal conditions at the 70th Grey Cup in 1982 paved the way for the construction of a domed stadium in Toronto.

Rogers Centre (Skydome before 2004) had provided the Argonauts a marquee venue from 1989 to 2015, but also been criticized for its football sightlines and atmosphere. Even crowds of about 30,000 looked sparse in a stadium that seats up to 50,000 people. The domed environment did, at least, remove the elements and was an advantage to passers and comfortable for fans. Two critical opportunities to find a new home were missed in 2004 and 2005: plans for a revamped Varsity Stadium to accommodate CFL-sized crowds were thwarted by community opposition in 2004, and the Argonauts withdrew from an alternate plan at York University the following year.

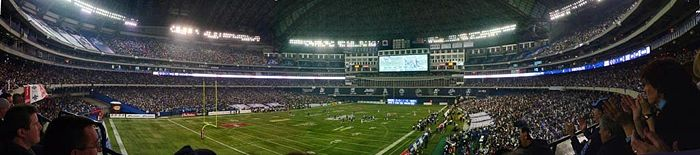
Panoramic view of the Argonauts home game at Rogers Centre. The stadium hosted home games for the Argonauts from 1989 to 2015

It was announced in 2013 that Rogers Centre's artificial turf would be replaced by natural grass within five years to better facilitate Toronto Blue Jays baseball. Replacing the playing surface would require permanently locking Rogers Centre into its baseball configuration, making it impossible to host CFL games. (However, since this time the stadium has retained its artificial turf surface [albeit with a full dirt infield], and it is unclear whether it will be replaced.) The stadium issue generated significant press and raised concerns over the team's long-term viability given that the Argonauts' losses have been estimated anywhere from $2 to $6 million annually. While various stadium rumours swirled over the course of David Braley's tenure (including building a new facility), it became increasingly clear that a move to a renovated BMO Field was the only viable option.

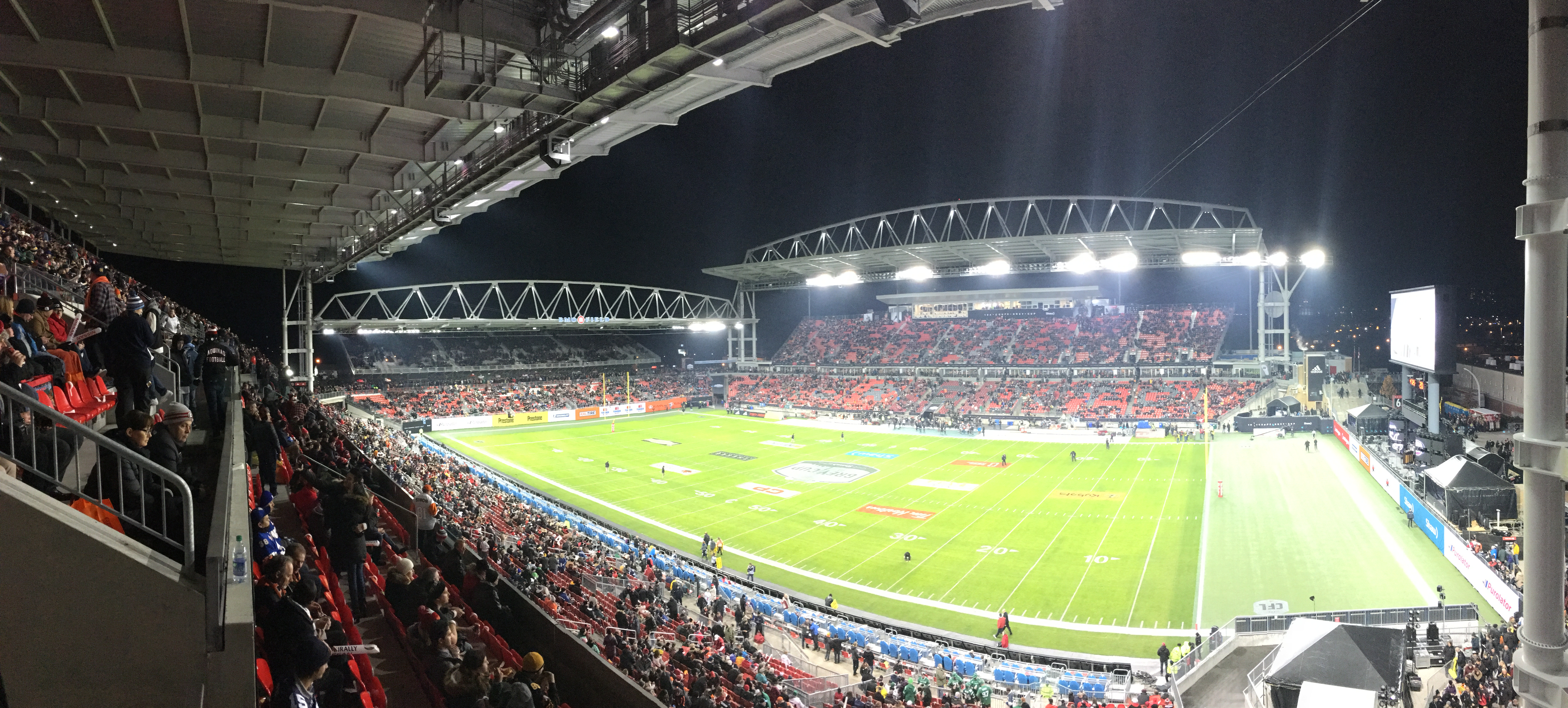
BMO Field with additional temporary seats in the south endzone for the 104th Grey Cup

The BMO Field move became finalized on May 20, 2015, concurrent with the announcement of the team's sale to a consortium of MLSE shareholders Larry Tanenbaum and Bell Canada. The team moved following the completion of stadium renovations for the 2016 season. The $120 million renovation plan had originally been announced in March 2014, and raised the stadium's seating capacity from 21,566 seats to 30,000 for soccer, with 25,000 seats in CFL configuration (due to space and safety issues, the endzones are only 18 yards deep [as opposed to the standard 20 yards], with part of both end zones covered in artificial turf, the remainder of the field has natural grass), and is temporarily expandable with additional endzone seating to 40,000 for big events such as a Grey Cup. The agreement required MLSE to reach a "long-term use (i.e. 20 years)" lease with the Argos for usage of the stadium. The inclusion of the CFL configuration had partly been at the insistence of the City of Toronto government, which owns BMO Field, and had been planned in the original stadium agreement.

Following the demolition and reconstruction of the 5,000 seat Varsity Stadium at the University of Toronto, the Argos returned to the stadium, hosting preseason games from 2013 to 2015. The team also acquired a much-needed training facility in July 2014 when it was announced that MLSE had partnered with the Argonauts to expand KIA Training Ground, Toronto FC's new state-of-the-art academy and training facility.

Since 2018, after Maple Leaf Sports & Entertainment became the new owners of the Argonauts, the team has used Lamport Stadium as their practice field, while their weight rooms are at Coca-Cola Coliseum; both locations are within walking distance of BMO Field. Since 2022, the Argonauts have used Alumni Stadium in Guelph as their home stadium for preseason games.

== Ownership and management ==
=== Ownership history ===
Ownership of the Toronto Argonauts
Owner	Tenure
Argonaut Rowing Club	October 4, 1873 – October 1, 1956
John W. H. Bassett, Charlie Burns, Eric Cradock	October 1, 1956 – January 1, 1960
John Bassett, Charlie Burns, Len Lumbers	January 1, 1960 – August 31, 1971
Baton Broadcasting (John Bassett)	August 31, 1971 – February 27, 1974
William R. Hodgson	February 27, 1974 – June 25, 1976
William R. Hodgson, Carling O'Keefe	June 25, 1976 – January 12, 1979
Carling O'Keefe	January 12, 1979 – December 12, 1988
Harry Ornest, Carling O'Keefe	December 12, 1988 – February 25, 1991
Bruce McNall, John Candy, Wayne Gretzky	February 25, 1991 – May 5, 1994
TSN Enterprises (Labatt)	May 5, 1994 – July 26, 1995
Labatt Brewing Company (Interbrew)	July 26, 1995 – December 20, 1999
Sherwood Schwarz	December 20, 1999 – July 29, 2003
Canadian Football League	July 29, 2003 – November 5, 2003
Howard Sokolowski and David Cynamon	November 5, 2003 – February 9, 2010
David Braley	February 9, 2010 – December 31, 2015
Kilmer Sports and Bell Canada	December 31, 2015 – January 18, 2018
Maple Leaf Sports & Entertainment	January 19, 2018 – present

For more than eight decades, the Toronto Argonauts Football Club was the sole property of its namesake rowing club. By the 1950s, the team's complex management structure made the arrangement increasingly awkward. Facing overdraft and with wealthy suitors knocking, the Argonaut rowers finally sold the team to a consortium led by John W. H. Bassett, Eric Cradock, and Charlie Burns in 1957. Each held about 20% share in the company, with the balance made up by small investors who had some affinity with the club; the initial agreement called for a long-term debenture of $400,000 to be set up that would sustain the rowing club in the absence of its football income. Bassett was the operating head of the franchise and is often given sole credit for the initial purchase of the Argos, but Cradock was also instrumental in spearheading the drive. He sold his share to Len Lumbers just two years into his tenure in part because of Bassett's controlling nature. Bassett arranged a complete buyout of the other shareholders for $2.31 million in 1971 through his holdings in Baton Broadcasting.

The Bassett years of the late 1950s to early 1970s were marked by mediocrity on the field but consistent success at the turnstiles. An issue that has become a perennial concern in the city also emerged at this time: the possibility of a National Football League team in Toronto. Various machinations were entertained by Bassett including moving the Argos to the NFL, bringing an American expansion team to the city (e.g. the Toronto Northmen of the WFL), or expanding the CFL itself in the opposite direction. Other team owners steadfastly opposed Bassett's moves and almost rescinded his franchise in 1974; angered, he sold the team for $3.3 million to hotel magnate William R. Hodgson in the same year.

Hodgson sold to Carling O'Keefe in 1979, who had been minority owners since 1976. The brewing company's total investment in the team was $5.8 million. At the time it was rapidly ramping up its sports sponsorship (it also owned the Quebec Nordiques before they moved from the World Hockey Association to the NHL) and would become a huge benefactor to the CFL itself, inking television rights deals that reached $11 million annually by 1984. Reports at the time suggest the league became spoiled by the partnership and that when the money dried up in 1987, the transition was difficult. For the Argos, the Carling O'Keefe years were marked by their first modern-era Grey Cup in 1983.

The years following the Carling O'Keefe era were marked by increasingly short ownership stints. Canadian businessman Harry Ornest bought the team off Carling O'Keefe for $5 million at the end of 1988 and then sold to the trio of Bruce McNall (60%), John Candy (20%), and Wayne Gretzky (20%) for the same amount in 1991. Of the three, Candy is best remembered for his emotional investment in the team and a team player award continues in his honour. The era was tumultuous despite a Grey Cup win in 1991, and the last in which the club regularly made front-page headlines. After a little over three years of ownership, McNall concluded he could no longer justify massive losses from an asset 3,000 miles away from his base in Los Angeles. He sold the now money-losing team to the Labatt Brewing Company through its TSN unit in May 1994 for $4.5 million; the closing was delayed by Candy's unexpected death that March. At the time, Labatt also owned the Toronto Blue Jays. In 1995, Labatt was acquired by Interbrew; The Interbrew years saw two championships but also the worst Argo attendance of the modern era. Interbrew soon lost interest in sports ownership and the team was sold again at the end of 1999 to New York businessman Sherwood Schwarz.

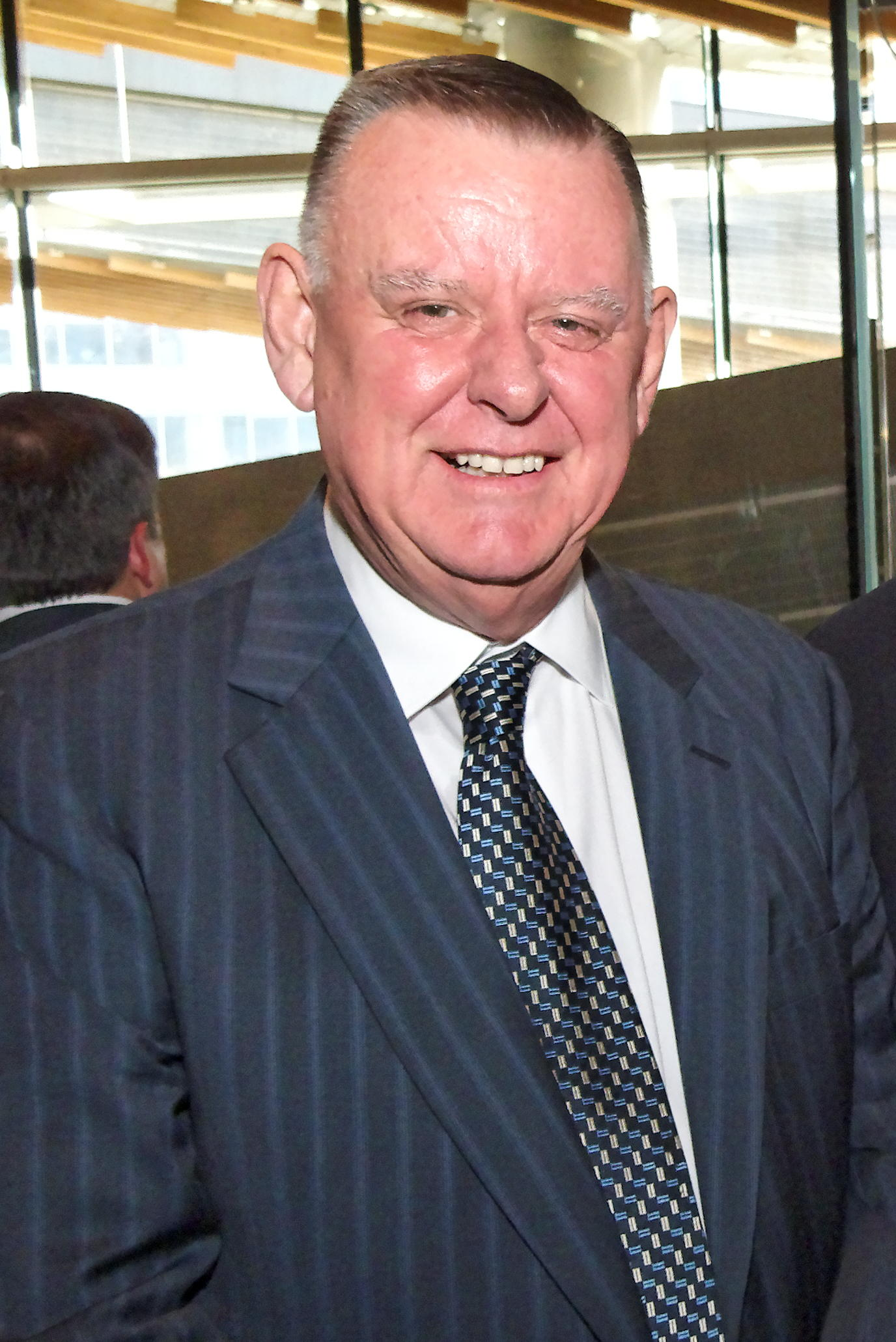
David Braley owned the club from 2010 to 2015

After the debacles of the Schwarz era and brief control of the team by the CFL (see above) the Argos were rescued by David Cynamon and Howard Sokolowski in 2004. There was optimism surrounding the duo's arrival and attendance figures improved in their six years heading the organization. It was also appreciated that the two were Torontonians after a quarter-century of foreign and/or corporate ownership. But by 2010 losses were great enough that the team was again put on the block and eventually sold to David Braley. There was some controversy surrounding Braley's takeover. He was simultaneously owner of the BC Lions, raising questions of competitive integrity. It was also revealed that Braley had bankrolled half of Cynamon and Sokolowski's initial $2 million buy-in of the Argos in 2004, and covered half their subsequent losses, in exchange for half of the 2007 Grey Cup profits.

By 2014 Maple Leaf Sports and Entertainment and its chairman and minority owner Larry Tanenbaum had emerged as serious suitors for the team. On May 20, 2015, it was announced that an agreement had been reached for Argonauts to be sold to Tanenbaum's Kilmer Sports and Bell Canada, who both own a stake in MLSE with Rogers Communications. Financial details were not disclosed. Despite its shared stake in MLSE, Rogers was not interested in having an ownership share in the Argonauts because it does not have any media relationships with the CFL (unlike Bell, whose TSN division holds the broadcast rights to the league). Argonauts Holdings Limited Partnership, a holding company which Bell and Kilmer each own 50% of, formally acquired the franchise on December 31, 2015.

On December 13, 2017, MLSE announced that it would acquire the Argos. This sale transferred ownership from Tanenbaum's Kilmer Sports and Bell Media to MLSE, which itself is owned by Tanenbaum, Bell Media and Rogers Communications. The sale was finalized on January 19, 2018 and with the sale, MLSE owns four of the five major professional sports franchises in the city of Toronto (only the Blue Jays are not owned by MLSE, although its owner, Rogers Communications, has 75% ownership stake of MLSE).

=== Senior executives ===
Toronto Argonauts senior executives
General manager	Tenure	President	Tenure
Lew Hayman	1957–1970	Lew Hayman	1966–1981
John Barrow	1971–1975	Ralph Sazio	1982–1989
Dick Shatto	1976–1978	Mike McCarthy	1990–1993
Tommy Hudspeth	1979–1981	Ron Barbaro	1993
Jim Eddy	1982–1983	Paul Beeston	1994
Ralph Sazio	1984–1985	Bob Nicholson	1995–1999
Leo Cahill	1986–1988	Sherwood Schwarz	2000–2001
Ralph Sazio	1989	Pinball Clemons	2002
Mike McCarthy	1990–1993	Dan Ferrone	2003
Bob O'Billovich	1994–1995	Keith Pelley	2004–2007
Don Matthews	1996	Pinball Clemons (CEO); Brad Watters (COO)	2008
Eric Tillman	1997	Bob Nicholson	2009–2011
Don Matthews	1998	Chris Rudge	2012–2015
Eric Tillman	1999	Michael Copeland	2016–2017
J. I. Albrecht	2000	Bill Manning	2018–2024
Paul Masotti	2001		
Gary Etcheverry	2002		
Pinball Clemons	2003		
Adam Rita	2004–2010		
Jim Barker	2011–2017		
Jim Popp	2017–2019		
Pinball Clemons	2019–present		

Below the ownership level, the two most senior positions within the Toronto Argonauts organization are its president and general manager. The GM role was titled as "managing director" from 1957 to 1966, when head coach Bob Shaw was also named "manager" of the team, "with full operating control", and managing director Lew Hayman was named club president. The role of club president had formerly been an honorary position; Hayman was the first president with a salary and executive role. The president role is now included in the title of CEO.

The longest serving executive in the organization is Lew Hayman, who had a five-decade career beginning in the 1930s as coach and administrator. A Jewish-American, Hayman served with both the Argos and Montreal Alouettes and has been called "the architect of Canadian football". He was the team's first president and managing director at the insistence of Eric Cradock in 1957, and would continue in the former role until 1981. Ralph Sazio took over from Hayman and is another hall of fame builder.

After relative stability at the senior executive level for three decades, there has been significant turnover in the positions since the 1990s. The team had eight general managers in eight years, for example, between 1996 and 2003. The current GM is Mike "Pinball" Clemons who was appointed to the position in October 2019. Chris Rudge, former head of the Canadian Olympic Committee, took over as president and CEO from the beginning of 2012 to the end of 2015, when Michael Copeland took over. The most recent president was Bill Manning who was also president of Toronto FC.

=== Head coaches ===
Fifty-nine men have been Toronto Argonauts head coach. The most recent coach, Ryan Dinwiddie, was appointed following the end of the 2019 season, and led the team to Grey Cup victories in 2022 and 2024.

The longest total tenure at head coach belongs to Bob O'Billovich, who led the team for 11 years over three stints in the 1980s and early 1990s. Other notable coaching careers include those of Joe Wright, Sr. at the end of the nineteenth century, Ted Morris and Frank Clair in the post-war years, Leo Cahill in the late 1960s and early 1970s, and Pinball Clemons after the turn of the millennium.

Since 1961, the Canadian Football League has awarded the Annis Stukus Trophy annually to the league's outstanding coach. (Alongside his playing career, Stukus achieved fame as a coach, promoter, and newspaper columnist.) Argonauts coaches have been honoured nine times: Cahill (1971), O'Billovich (1981 & 1987), Adam Rita (1991), Don Matthews (1997), Jim Barker (2010), Milanovich (2012), Trestman (2017), and Dinwiddie (2023).

== Current team ==
=== Current roster ===
Toronto Argonauts roster
**Quarterbacks**: 4 Nick Arbuckle; 5 Tucker Horn; 12 Chad Kelly; **Receivers**: 86 Damonte Coxie; 3 Janarion Grant WR/KR; 82 Tyler Kahmann; 10 Kevin Mital; 15 Makai Polk; 81 Tristan Ready; 83 David Ungerer; **Running backs**: 38 Cam Porter; 21 Isaiah Smith; **Fullbacks**: 45 Jack Cassar; 41 Sebastian Parsalidis	**Offensive linemen**: 68 Desmond Bland; 62 Ryan Hunter; 67 Chris Kolankowski; 52 Peter Nicastro; 69 Kendall Randolph; 64 Dakoda Shepley; 56 Frank Vreugdenhil; **Defensive linemen**: 97 Dewayne Hendrix; 99 Ralph Holley; 98 Da'Marcus Johnson; 95 Jonathan Kongbo; 42 Shawn Lemon; 92 Paris Shand; 91 Soane Toia	**Linebackers**: 35 Isaac Darkangelo; 26 Brian Harelimana; 49 Jordan Herdman-Reed; 46 Vi Jones; 40 Darius McKenzie; 33 Alexander Teubner; **Defensive backs**: 1 DaShaun Amos; 34 Bubba Bolden; 28 James Ceasar; 37 Dathan Hickey; 23 Benjie Franklin; 9 Louis-Philippe Gauthier; 24 Ethan John; 6 Adarius Pickett; **Special teams**: 14 James Burnip P; 47 Adam Guillemette LS; 70 Lirim Hajrullahu K	**Reserve**: 61 Brandon Kemp OL; 0 Dymere Miller WR; **1-game injured**: 76 Ali Fayad DL; 87 Jake Herslow WR; 20 Derek Slywka DB; 17 Nolan Ulm WR; **6-game injured**: 94 Andrew Chatfield DL; 27 Owen Goss LB; 8 Cameron Judge LB; 2 Tarvarus McFadden DB; 44 Jeremiah Ojo DL; 11 Robert Priester DB; 63 Rush Reimer OL	**Practice roster**: 36 Akili Arnold DB; 93 Jalen Bell DL; 84 Michael Buckley WR; 96 Jason Compoh DL; 13 Solomon Davis WR; 90 Denzel Daxon DL; 29 John Haggerty P; 25 Samuel Hicks RB; 7 Qualan Jones RB; 79 Gabriel Maisonneuve DL; 32 James Neal LB; 16 Luis Perez QB; 66 Domenico Piazza OL; 30 Jalen Rayam LB; 43 Nic Toomer DB; **Suspended**: 14 Delonte Hood DB; -- Keenan Isaac DB; 56 George Moore OL
Italics indicate American player • **Bold** indicates Global player • 45 Active, 2 Reserve, 15 Practice, 11 Injured, 3 Suspended; Roster updated 2026-10-30 • Depth chart • Transactions • More CFL rosters

=== Football operations and coaching staff ===
Toronto Argonauts staff
**Front office and support staff**: Owner – Maple Leaf Sports & Entertainment; President – Vacant; General manager – Michael Clemons; Director, Player Personnel – Jim Barker; Senior Advisor – John Hufnagel; Director, Football Operations – Melissa Firth; Pro Scout Coordinator – Afram Jolak; Pro and Canadian Scouting Assistant – Nate Bickford; Head Athletic Therapist – Josh Shewell; Assistant Athletic Therapist – Mark Belmore; Equipment Manager – Danny Webb; Assistant Equipment Manager – David Sillberg; Strength and Conditioning – Usama Mujtaba; Manager, Football Media – Chris Balenovich; Manager, Communications – Mike Hogan	**Head coaches**: Head Coach – Mike Miller; Assistant Head Coach – Demetrious Maxie; **Offensive coaches**: Offensive coordinator – Mike Miller; Quarterbacks – Chris Miller; Receivers – Kierrie Johnson; Offensive Line – Dominic Picard; Running backs – Ka'Deem Carey; Assistant Offensive Line and Quality Control – Colyn Haugh; **Defensive coaches**: Defensive Coordinator and Linebackers – Greg Quick; Defensive Backs – Jovon Johnson; Defensive Line – Demetrious Maxie; Assistant Linebackers and Quality Control – Bubba Walker; **Special teams coaches**: Special Teams Coordinator – Mickey Donovan; → Coaching Staff → More CFL staffs

== Broadcasts ==
Argonauts games are currently carried on TSN's national and regional television channel as part of CFL on TSN broadcasts. Radio coverage is carried on CHUM (AM) or on CFRB 1010 when there is a scheduling conflict and another sport is being carried on TSN Radio.

Notable Argonauts' broadcasters include John Badham, who had three tenures on three separate radio stations and was inducted into the media wing of the Canadian Football Hall of Fame in 1995, and longtime colour analyst Peter Martin, an Argo linebacker from 1965 to 1972, also inducted into the Hall of Fame's media wing in 2000.

Toronto Argonauts broadcasters
Tenure	Flagship station	Play–by–play	Colour	Reference
1930s–1957	CFRB	Wes McKnight		
1958–1959	CFRB	Wes McKnight	Brian McFarlane and Zeke O'Connor	
1960–1968	CFRB	Bill Stephenson	Zeke O'Connor	
1969–1975	CHFI/CFTR	John Badham		
1976	CFRB	Dave Hodge	Mel Profit	
1977–1980	CFRB	Dave Hodge	Peter Martin	
1981	CFRB	John Badham	Peter Martin	
1982–1987	CFRB	Bob Bratina	Peter Martin	
1988	CJCL	John Badham	Bill Watters	
1989–1991	CHUM	Marc Charlebois	Peter Martin	
1992–1994	CFRB	Bill Stephenson	Peter Martin	
1995	CHOG	Mark Hebscher	Lance Chomyc	
1996	CHOG	Mark Hebscher	Wally Zatylny	
1997–1999	CHOG	Bob Bratina	Peter Martin	
2000	CJCL	Mike Hogan	Peter Martin	
2001	CFMJ	Jim Lang	Peter Martin	
2002	CFMJ	Jim Lang	Brian Warren and Rick Loewen	
2003	CJCL	Mike Hogan	Peter Martin	
2004	CFMJ	Paul Romanuk or Jaime Stein	Peter Martin	
2005–2006	CFMJ	Jaime Stein	Peter Martin	
2007–2010	CJCL	Mike Hogan	Peter Martin	
2011–2013	CHUM	Mike Hogan	Sandy Annunziata	
2014–2017	CHUM	Mike Hogan	Jeff Johnson	
2018–2019	CHUM	Mike Hogan	Chris Schultz	
2021	CHUM	Mike Hogan	Natey Adjei	
2022	CHUM	Mike Hogan	Natey Adjei, Bob Bronk, or Ben Grant	
2023–present	CHUM	Mike Hogan	Ben Grant	

== Rivalries ==
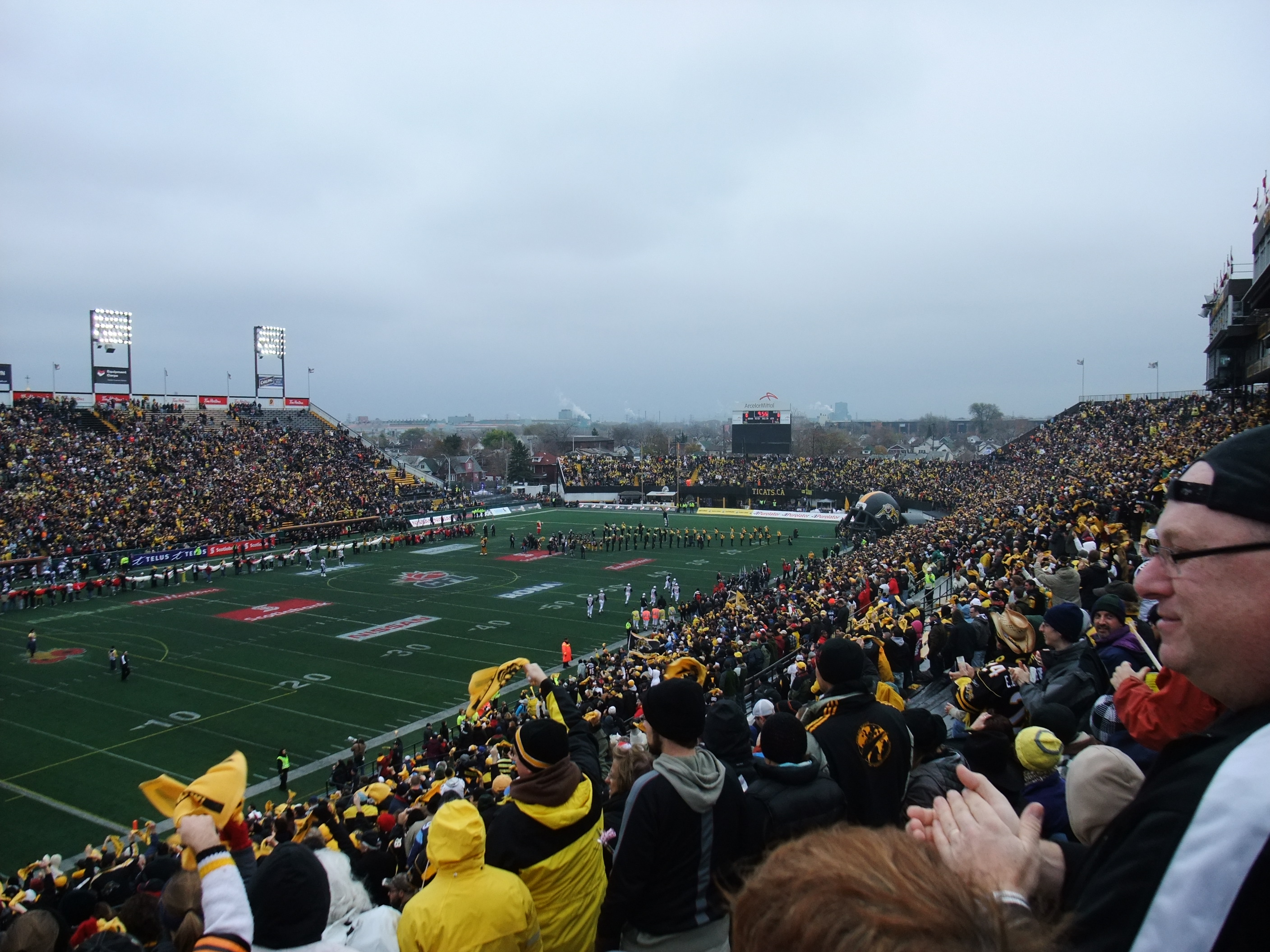
An Argos game against the Ti-Cats at Ivor Wynne Stadium in 2010

With few teams, but a long history, it is inevitable that intense rivalries have developed in Canadian football. A commonly known Argonaut rivalry has been with the Hamilton Tiger-Cats and its precursor teams. Fittingly, the Argonauts' first game was against a club from Hamilton, while the raucous Eastern Final of 2013—featuring a Tiger-Cat win over the Argos in front of 35,000 at the Rogers Centre—proved the rivalry is alive and well. The two teams meet in Hamilton every year in the Labour Day Classic, a league-wide tradition in which these two teams have participated since 1950.

To the east, the Argonauts have also faced teams from Montreal and Ottawa since their earliest days. In recent years, the Montreal Alouettes have consistently fielded strong teams which have often run up against the Argos in the playoffs; the teams have met 11 times in the Eastern Final, with Montreal taking six.

In 2014, the Argonauts reignited their historic rivalry with an Ottawa club, the expansion Ottawa Redblacks (earlier rivalries involved the Ottawa Renegades and Ottawa Rough Riders). In games against the current Ottawa franchise, as of the end of 2024 the Argos hold a 19–6 advantage; 20–6 if the 2024 East Semi-Final result is included.

In Grey Cups, the Argonauts have faced an assortment of teams in recent decades rather than any one team regularly. The Edmonton Eskimos, for years a dominant team in the league, have been an occasional rival. The two teams' five Grey Cup matchups include an epic 38–36 Toronto loss in 1987 and most recently, the Snow Bowl victory in 1996 led by the arm of Doug Flutie. In pre-CFL days, the Argos had a Grey Cup rivalry with the Winnipeg Blue Bombers.

== Notable personnel ==
Toronto Argonauts retired numbers
No.	Player	Position	Tenure	Championships
22	Dick Shatto^{1}	RB	1954–1965	–
31	Michael "Pinball" Clemons^{2}	RB/SB/KR/PR	1989–2000	1991, 1996, 1997
55	Joe Krol	QB/RB/P/K/DB	1945–1952, 1955	1945, 1946, 1947, 1950, 1952
60	Danny Nykoluk	OT	1955, 1957–1971	–
^{1} General manager from 1976 to 1978.^{2} Head coach from 2000 to 2007, president from 2001 to 2002, vice-chairman from 2009 to 2019, and general manager 2019–present.

The highest distinction the Toronto Argonauts can accord a player is to retire their number; just four players have received the honour. Starting in 1996, the team began another category of distinction with its list of "All-Time Argos". Twenty-four players have been rewarded so far and a banner in their honour hangs at BMO Field.

Players and management personnel may be separately inducted into the Canadian Football Hall of Fame. A total of 56 people who have been part of the team are in the Hall. The All-Time Argos list does not extend back to before the Second War era while the Hall of Fame does. Thus, for instance, Lionel Conacher is in the Hall but not listed as an All-Time Argo.

Finally, players may be honoured on an annual basis through the CFL awards. The most prestigious of these is the Most Outstanding Player Award, awarded since 1953. Seven Argonauts have been recipients: Chad Kelly (2023), Chad Owens (2012), Damon Allen (2005), Doug Flutie (1996 & 1997), Michael "Pinball" Clemons (1990), Condredge Holloway (1982), and Bill Symons (1968).

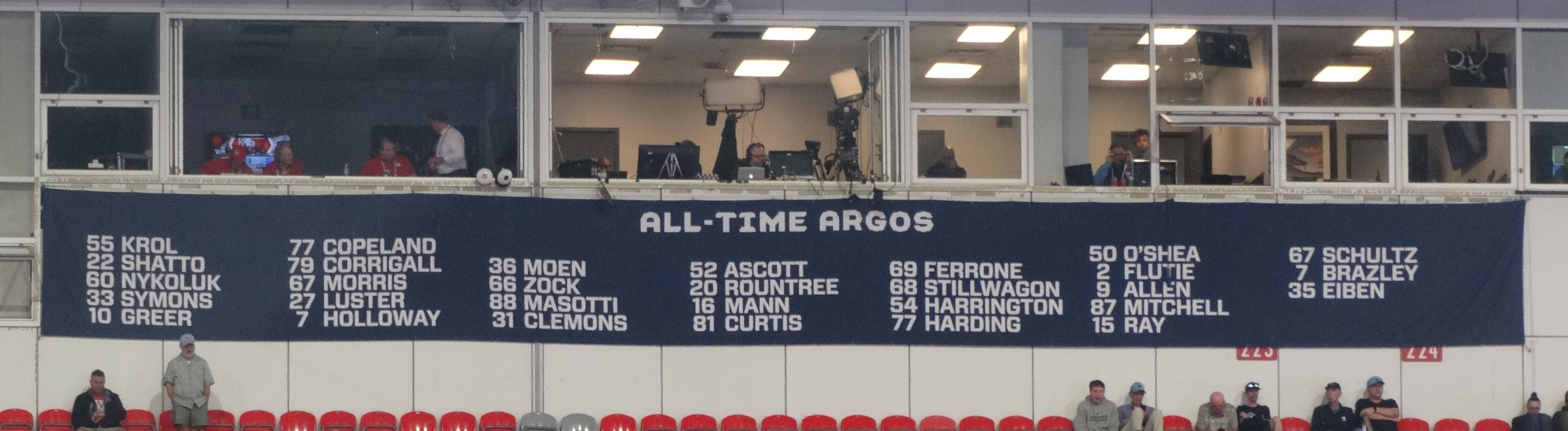
The All-Time Argonauts list as of 2026.

=== All-Time and Hall of Fame ===
Toronto Argonauts Honoured Personnel
Affiliation in Hall of Fame based on team acknowledgement
All Time Argonauts
Les Ascott; Carl Brazley; Damon Allen; Michael "Pinball" Clemons; Royal Copeland; Jim Corrigall	Ulysses "Crazy Legs" Curtis; Kevin Eiben; Dan Ferrone; Doug Flutie; Terry Greer; Rodney Harding	Ed Harrington; Lew Hayman; Condredge Holloway; Joe Krol; Marv Luster	Dave Mann; Peter Martin; Paul Masotti; Derrell Mitchell; Don Moen	Teddy Morris; Danny Nykoluk; Bob O'Billovich; Mike O'Shea; Ricky Ray	Jim Rountree; Chris Schultz; Dick Shatto; Jim Stillwagon; Bill Symons; Bill Zock
Hall of Fame Players
Damon Allen; John Barrow; Danny Bass; Harry Batstone; Paul Bennett; Leroy Blugh; Ab Box; Josh Bourke; Joe Breen; Jerry Campbell; Michael "Pinball" Clemons	Tommy Joe Coffey; Lionel Conacher; Royal Copeland; Jim Corrigall; Larry Crawford; Wes Cutler; Matt Dunigan; Terry Evanshen; Cap Fear; Dan Ferrone; Doug Flutie	Bill Frank; Vince Goldsmith; S. J. Green; Terry Greer; Tracy Ham; Condredge Holloway; Hank Ilesic; Bob Isbister; Russ Jackson; Bobby Jurasin; Ellison Kelly	Joe Krol; Smirle Lawson; Neil Lumsden; Marv Luster; Derrell Mitchell; Joe Montford; Frank Morris; Teddy Morris; Ray Nettles; Mike O'Shea; Chad Owens	Jackie Parker; James Parker; Willie Pless; Dave Raimey; Ted Reeve; Rocco Romano; Dick Shatto; Orlondo Steinauer; Don Sutherin; Bill Symons	Ricky Ray; Dave Thelen; Dick Thornton; Andy Tommy; Pierre Vercheval; David Williams; Tom Wilkinson; Don Wilson; Ben Zambiasi; Bill Zock
Hall of Fame Builders
David Braley; Frank Clair; Frank Cosentino	Bernie Custis; William C. Foulds; Jake Gaudaur	Lew Hayman; Tuffy Knight; Don Matthews	Jack Newton; Bob O'Billovich	Mike Rodden; Ralph Sazio	Annis Stukus; Frank Tindall

== Mascot ==
Jason is the mascot for the Toronto Argonauts, replacing the previous mascot, Argo Bounce, in 2005, who in turn replaced the team's first mascot, Scully, in 2003.

== See also ==
- Toronto Argonauts all-time records and statistics
- Argonotes, the former Toronto Argonauts band

== Notes ==
Footnotes

Citations
