= William R. Hodgson =

William R. Hodgson, also known as "WR" and Bill Hodgson (22 January 1926 – 9 December 1998) was a hotel magnate from Etobicoke and was once the owner of the Toronto Argonauts and the Old Mill Inn & Spa.

== Business ==
As a business man, in 1960, he founded Hodgson Hotels Corporation. Later he started Skyline hotels. In 1973, he bought the Old Mill Inn & Spa in Etobicoke. He restored the building, saving it from destruction. In 1990, Hodgson purchased the Doctor's House in Kleinburg, Ontario, and also completely restored and expanded the facility to include banquet facilities and a non-denominational chapel.

== Horse Racing ==
Kingsbrook Farm was a 120-acre thoroughbred horse breeding farm and training facility founded by Hodgson in Kettleby, Ontario. The farm operated from 1981 to 1993 and produced standout winners including: Cool Halo, Perfect Player, O'Martin (nominated for Sovereign Award), and Blushing Katy who won the Sovereign Award as top three-year-old filly in 1989.

== Politics ==
Hodgson was an Etobicoke Councillor.

== Toronto Argonauts ==
On 27 February 1974, Hodgson bought the Toronto Argonauts from John W. H. Bassett who owned Baton Broadcasting. He owned it outright until 25 June 1976 when he brought in Carling O'Keefe to run it jointly with him. This continued until when on 12 January 1979, he sold his remaining stake to Carling O'Keefe.

Despite not winning a Grey Cup during his time, attendance was higher than it was in other trophy-winning periods. In 1976, attendance was around the 45,000 mark regularly selling out the Exhibition Stadium.

== Death ==
He died of cancer on 9 December 1998 at the age of 76.
