= Robert Binder =

Member of the Canadian Forces Naval Reserve

Robert Teodor Binder
- Born: 27 June 1989; Mississauga, Ontario
- Died: 22 June 2010 (aged 20)
- Military career
- Allegiance: Canada
- Branch: Canadian Forces Naval Reserve
- Rank: Leading Seaman
- Unit: HMCS York
- Awards: Medal of Bravery

Leading Seaman Robert Teodor Binder MB (27 June 1989 – 22 June 2010), of Mississauga, Ontario, was a member of the Canadian Forces Naval Reserve who was posthumously awarded the Medal of Bravery on 26 November 2010. The citation to his award notes that on the night of 14 August 2008, at the age of nineteen, he and two others repeatedly dove and performed CPR in order to rescue the occupants of a sinking car.

Leading Seaman Binder died in June 2010, two weeks before the announcement of his decoration. His Medal of Bravery was awarded posthumously by the Chief of Defence Staff, General Walter Natynczyk at his former unit, HMCS York.
