= 38th Grey Cup =

1950 Canadian Football championship game

Toronto Argonauts	Winnipeg Blue Bombers
(6–5–1)	(10–4)
13	0
Head coach: Frank Clair	Head coach: Frank Larson
	1	2	3	4	Total
Toronto Argonauts	1	6	6	0	13
Winnipeg Blue Bombers	0	0	0	0	0
- Date: November 25, 1950
- Stadium: Varsity Stadium
- Location: Toronto
- Referee: Paul Dojack
- Attendance: 27,101

The 38th Grey Cup, played at Varsity Stadium in Toronto on November 25, 1950, before 27,101 fans, also known as the Mud Bowl, was the Canadian football championship game played between the Toronto Argonauts and the Winnipeg Blue Bombers. The Argonauts won the game 13–0.

== Conditions on the field ==
On the day before the game, a rare, heavy late November snowfall blanketed the field. Heavy equipment was dispatched to clear the snowfall before the game. However, the equipment damaged the turf, which was already in bad shape from poor groundskeeping during the regular season. To make matters worse, on the morning of the game the weather turned much warmer, and the snowfall turned to steady rain. By game time, the field was torn up and soaked with water, with the rain continuing through the entire game. Both teams had difficulty moving the ball in the conditions.

Toronto Argonauts win Grey Cup 1950 in Mud Bowl Varsity Stadium

== Summary ==
The game was remembered more for its poor field conditions than the actual game itself. The 1950 Grey Cup, forever dubbed "The Mud Bowl," was won by the Toronto Argonauts, as they shut out the Winnipeg Blue Bombers 13–0. The game featured two teams facing each other for the sixth time in the Canadian football classic.

The wet and muddy conditions at Toronto's Varsity Stadium created a quagmire but did not prevent the Argonauts from winning their eighth Grey Cup title. The Argos kicked for what turned out to be the winning point in the first quarter. Winnipeg's Tom Casey misjudged Joe Krol's punt from the Blue Bombers 49-yard line, as the ball went over his head and into the end zone for a rouge. Joe Krol avoided a potential turnover later in the half when he dropped the ball on an attempted kick in Bombers territory. The Argo star picked it up and raced around the end for 10 yards, putting the ball on the Winnipeg 15. After failing to make another first down, Nick Volpe kicked a 21-yard field goal to put the Argos up 4-0.

Before the end of the first half, the Argos increased the margin to 7-0. Toronto's Billy Bass recovered Indian Jack Jacobs fumble at the Winnipeg 19. After two running plays from Ulysses "Crazy Legs" Curtis and Teddy Toogood, Nick Volpe was successful on a field goal from the Winnipeg 23. The Argos completed the scoring in the third quarter. Toronto's Jake Dunlap blocked Jacobs' kick which the Boatmen recovered at the Winnipeg 20. Billy Bass and Al Dekdebrun carried to the four-yard line and Toogood to the one. On third down Dekdebrun slid across the goal line for the only touchdown of the game. Volpe missed the convert, but Joe Krol later kicked a single for the final point of the game. Dekdebrun directed Toronto's ground offence all game, which steamrolled the Winnipeg defence for 232 yards.

This is the last time a team has been shut out in the Grey Cup final.

== Legacy ==
The aftermath of the game generated severe criticism of the Canadian Rugby Union and the choice of Varsity, which had traditionally hosted the game almost every year due to its relatively large capacity and generally warmer weather in late November and early December compared to other cities. Some believed the game could have been played a week earlier to avoid adverse weather conditions. Wrote one writer, "Because the field was like a pig's wallow, what should have been a football classic turned into a slogging show." The lack of a tarpaulin to protect the field, which could have been obtained for approximately $5,000, was noted. The Calgary Stampeders, who had faced bad field conditions in the 1948 championship game, offered to pick up the expense on behalf of the league, but this offer was declined. Although Varsity Stadium, and later Exhibition Stadium, continued to be the primary venue for the Grey Cup, the criticism of the conditions at both fields eventually led to the venue shifting among the cities of the Interprovincial Rugby Football Union and the Western Interprovincial Football Union on a regular basis.

== Box score ==
First quarter

Toronto – Rouge – Joe Krol 49 yard punt

Second quarter

Toronto – Field Goal – Nick Volpe 21 yards
Toronto – Field Goal – Nick Volpe 23 yards

Third quarter

Toronto – TD – Al Dekdebrun 1 yard run (convert missed)
Toronto – Rouge – Joe Krol 00 yard punt

Teams	1 Q	2 Q	3 Q	4 Q	Final
Toronto Argonauts	1	6	6	0	13
Winnipeg Blue Bombers	0	0	0	0	0

== See also ==
Other Grey Cup games notable for the weather include the 1962 Fog Bowl at Exhibition Stadium in Toronto, the 1965 Wind Bowl at Exhibition Stadium in Toronto, the 1977 Ice Bowl at Olympic Stadium in Montréal, the 1982 Rain Bowl at Exhibition Stadium in Toronto and the 1996 Snow Bowl at Ivor Wynne Stadium in Hamilton.
