= Mike Hogan (sportscaster) =

Canadian sportscaster (born 1963)

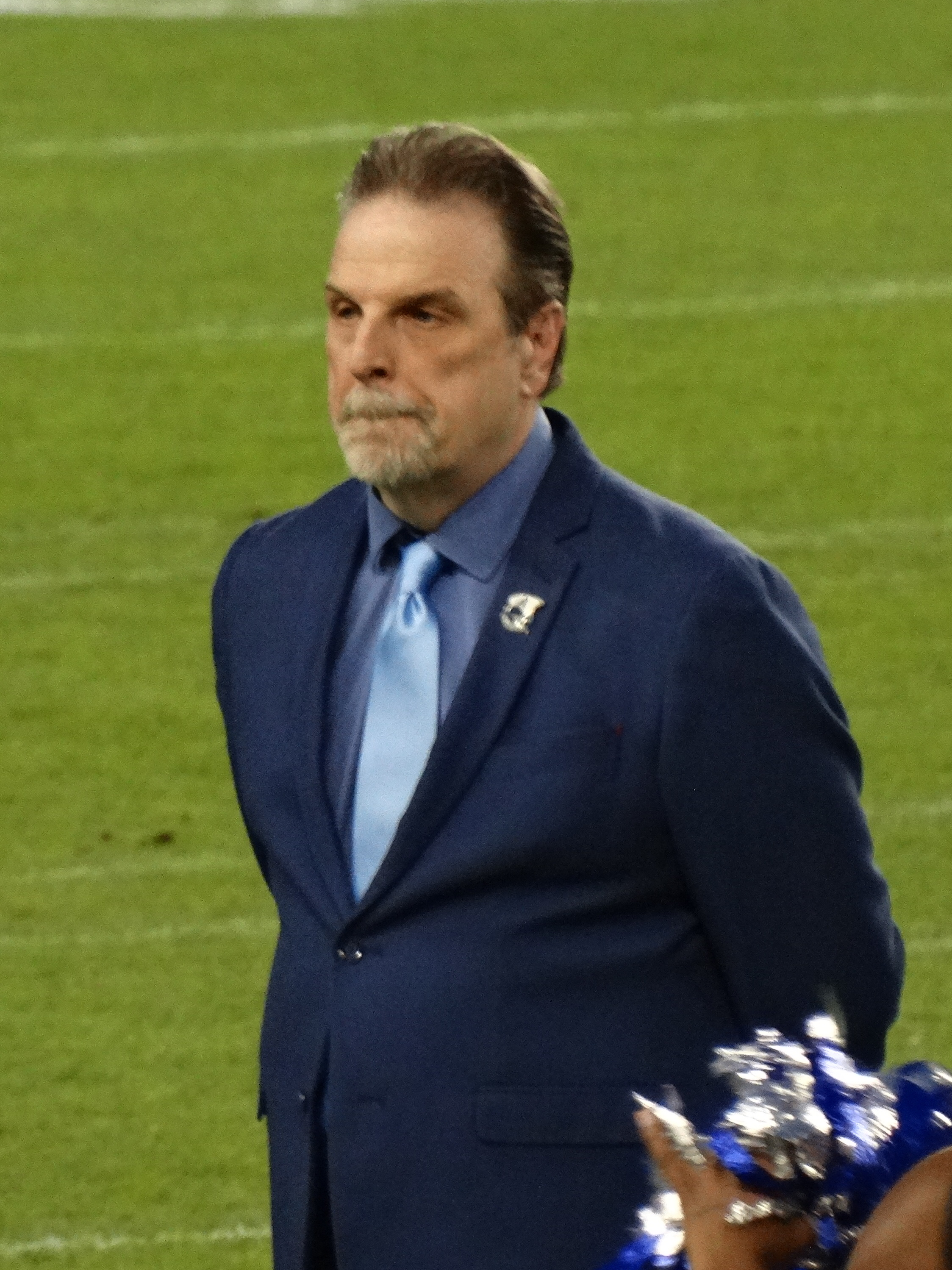
- Hogan in 2024
- Born: 1963 (age 62–63); Kingston, Ontario, Canada
- Occupation: broadcaster
- Known for: talk radio host, play-by-play announcer

Mike Hogan (born 1963) is a Canadian sportscaster who serves as the play-by-play voice for the Toronto Argonauts of the Canadian Football League for TSN Radio 1050's gameday broadcasts. Hogan was formerly a long time sports talk radio host on Toronto station CJCL (AM), branded "The Fan 590", until he was relieved of those duties on June 24, 2010. Hogan later became a sports talk radio host on TSN Radio 1050 in Toronto, Ontario. In January 2019, Hogan left sports talk radio to work full-time with the Argonauts as the team's manager of communication while concurrently serving as their radio play-by-play voice. Hogan was born in Kingston, Ontario.

== Fan 590 tenure ==
Hogan previously hosted a weekday morning sports radio show on the Fan 590 called The Mike Hogan Show (originally named The Bullpen) from 9 AM to 12 PM. Typically, the first hour was hosted solely by Hogan as he takes calls from listeners, while the last two hours was previously co-hosted by another guest sportscaster from TSN in the early 2000s, but later changed to a guest sportscaster from Rogers Sportsnet (due to the station being acquired by Rogers Communications) as they both discussed daily sports topics while also interviewing guests. During the later part of the 2000s, Mike Toth became the mainstay co-host of The Bullpen for the last two hours of the show. In late 2009, Toth was let go from the station, leaving Hogan as the sole host for the full 3 hours.

During both the CFL and NFL seasons, the first hour on Fridays was co-hosted with former Argonaut and former NFL player Chris Schultz as a one-hour show dedicated to a weekly discussion on the CFL and/or NFL called "Football Friday". Inside the Argos was initially a regular segment of The Mike Hogan Show during the first hour on Wednesdays in the late 2000s until Hogan's show was cancelled. The show was co-hosted by former Argonaut defensive back Adrion Smith during 2007, and offensive lineman Sandy Annunziata during 2008 and 2009.

During the CFL season, Hogan also served as the play-by-play voice for the Toronto Argonauts on The Fan 590's radio broadcasts (or webcasts from their website if the games conflicted with a Toronto Blue Jays radio broadcast) with former Argonauts linebacker Pete Martin as his colour analyst. Also during the season, Hogan hosted a one-hour show dedicated to a weekly discussion on the Argonauts featuring interviews of the team members called Inside the Argos. This program aired on the FAN 590 on a weekly basis during the midweek evenings.

In June 2010, Hogan was let go by the Fan 590.

== TSN Radio 1050 tenure ==
On April 12, 2011, it was announced that Hogan, along with Matt Cauz, would host TSN Radio 1050's weekend show, "TSN 1050 Game Day". Additionally, Hogan co-hosted 'Football Sunday' with Chris Schultz, from 11am-1pm, covering the CFL, NFL, NCAA and CIS. Hogan also hosted "Argos All Access", a weekly radio show on the Toronto Argonauts broadcast every Monday at 7 PM EST.

Since joining TSN Radio 1050 in 2011, Hogan also served as the play-by-play voice of the Argonauts for the station's broadcasts of their games. In January 2019, Hogan left sports talk radio to join the Toronto Argonauts as their full-time manager of communications while concurrently serving as the play-by-play voice of the team on the station's game day broadcasts. Since 2023, Ben Grant has served as the colour commentator alongside Hogan.

== Krown Countdown U/Krown Gridiron Nation on TSN ==
Starting in the 2017 season, Hogan joined Krown Countdown U radio on the TSN Radio network as a co-host with Jim Mullin and as a panelist on the TV show joining Gord Randall. He moved with the TV show in 2019 as it rebranded to Krown Gridiron Nation on TSN from CHCH TV and CBCSports.ca, commenting on Canadian football players in the NCAA and U SPORTS football.

== Other sportscasting background ==
Hogan previously served as the radio play-by-play voice for the Wilfrid Laurier Golden Hawks football team on CKGL '570 News' based in Kitchener, Ontario. He has also provided play-by-play of OUA basketball and football games on CHCH-TV's weekly broadcasts of the OUA Game of the Week, as well as providing weekly football analysis on Global TV's Global Sports (formerly Sportsline).

Hogan has also contributed some blogs for the CFL's website.
