= Sherwood Schwarz =

American businessman (1930–2023)

Sherwood Schwarz (November 1930 – February 14, 2023) was an American businessman and founder of Carnegie Associates Ltd and was the owner of the Toronto Argonauts from 1999 to 2003.

== Biography ==
Schwarz was born in 1930 on the Lower East Side of New York City, the only child of Romanian and Russian parents. He graduated from the City College of New York with degrees in accounting and business administration. After serving in the U.S. Army during the Korean War, he went to work in insurance. He founded Carnegie Associates Ltd, situated on Sixth Avenue in Manhattan and part of White Tiger Holding Company, Inc. Schwarz died on February 14, 2023, at the age of 92.

== Toronto Argonauts ==
On 20 December 1999, Schwarz bought the Toronto Argonauts from Interbrew. He was persuaded to do by his cousin J. I. Albrecht, who became managing director after Schwarz bought the team. Attendance at the Argonauts increased soon after his arrival. He cut ticket prices by 15% and stopped Argonauts games from being blacked out, boosting television ratings.

At the start the 2001 CFL season, he made Michael 'Pinball' Clemons head coach on an interim basis. In 2002, Clemons was made the permanent head coach and went on to make history by becoming the first black coach to win the Grey Cup in 2004.

In early 2002, Schwarz brought in Garth Drabinsky, the founder of Cineplex Cinemas, to increase the public profile of the Argonauts.

In 2003, despite numerous attempts, the finances of the Argonauts failed to improve. To keep the club afloat, Schwarz had to inject $18 million of his own money. He tried to find partners to help finance the team. By 2002, several of the club's creditors had not been paid for months. On 29 July 2003, as the 2003 CFL season began, the CFL assumed control of the team and Schwarz left the club.
