= HMCS York =

Coordinates: 43.6342°N 79.4028°W

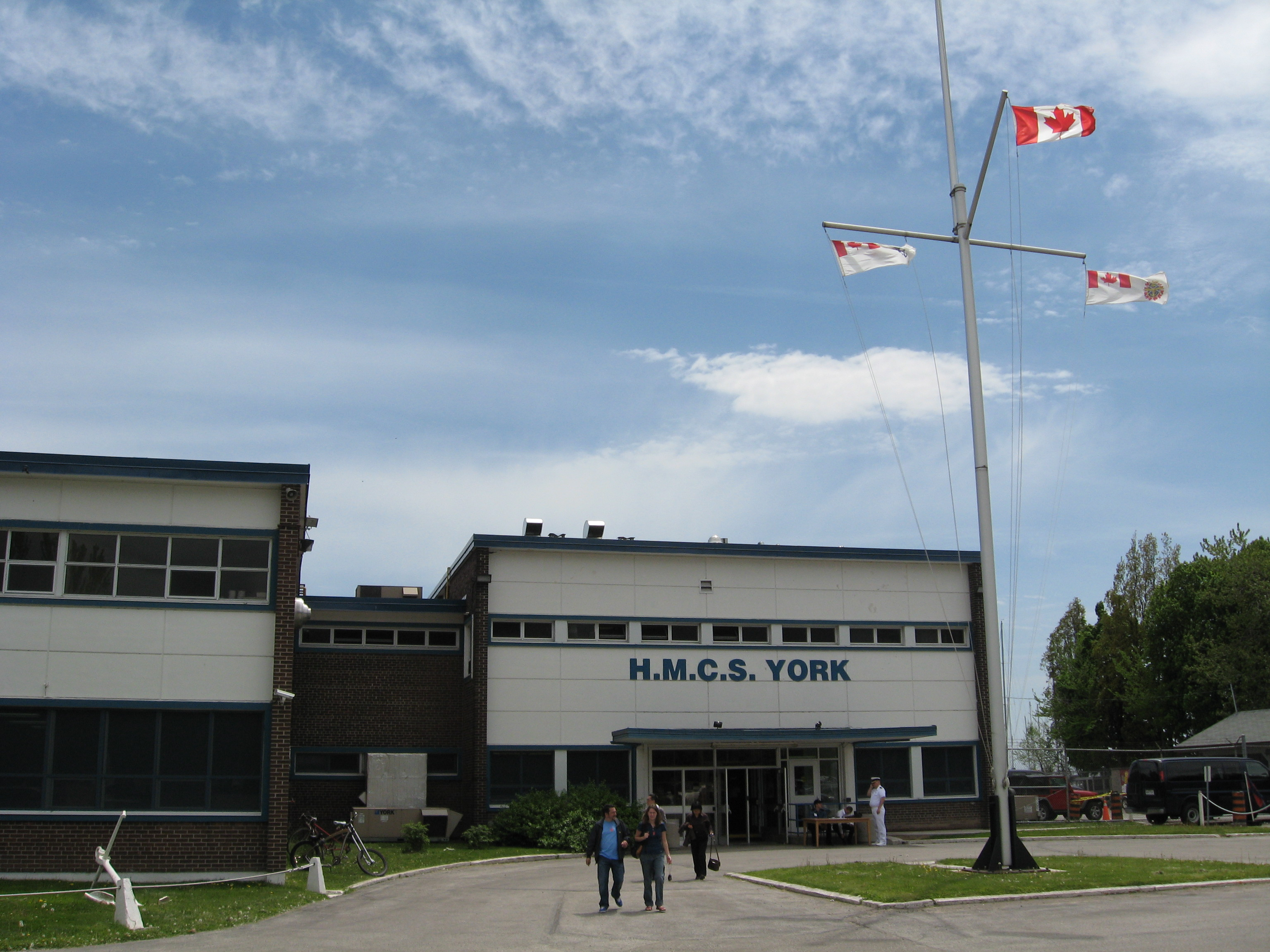
- HMCS York in 2009
- Active: 1923-Present
- Country: Canada
- Branch: Royal Canadian Navy
- Type: Naval Reserve Division
- Role: Reserve unit
- Size: Approx. 400 Reservist sailors and officers
- Garrison/HQ: 659 Lake Shore Boulevard West; Toronto, Ontario; M5V 1A7
- Motto: Bon Espoir (Good hope)
- Colours: Azure Blue and White
- Equipment: 24 ft (7.3 m) RHIB (ZH-733 CDO)
- Battle honours: Pre-The First World War: Lowestoft, 1665; Orfordness, 1666; Sole Bay, 1672; Schooneveld, 1673; Texel, 1673; Louisburg, 1758; Martinique, 1809; Post-The First World War: Atlantic, 1939; Norway, 1940; Mediterranean, 1940–41; Malta Convoys, 1941

Commanders
- Current commander: Commander Paul Smith, OMM, MSM, CD

HMCS York is a Royal Canadian Navy Reserve Division (NRD) located in Toronto, Ontario. Dubbed a stone frigate, HMCS York is a land-based naval establishment for part-time sailors as well as a local recruitment centre for the Canadian Naval Reserve.

== History ==
The unit was established in 1942 to replace the Royal Canadian Navy Volunteer Reserve Half Company created in 1923. During World War II, it was a premiere naval recruiting depot in the British Commonwealth through which over 17,000 personnel passed during the years of the war.

HMCS York was named after the original name of the city of Toronto and the first British commercial craft on Lake Ontario.

York is home to the Canadian Forces Sailing Association's Toronto establishment.

== Athletics ==
During the Second World War, Toronto HMCS York fielded a football team in the Ontario Rugby Football Union (ORFU). Some of the notable players and coaches associated with the team were: Royal Copeland, Steve Karrys, Bob Stewart and the coach Teddy Morris.

== Facilities ==
Although located on the Lake Ontario shoreline, York has no facilities for naval ships. Rigid-hulled inflatable boats (RHIB) are deployed at the division, but the mooring facilities to the south of HMCS York belong to Toronto's branch of the Canadian Forces Sailing Association, the National Yacht Club, and Alexandra Yacht Club, and are for pleasure craft and such working vessels as serve the clubs.

Prior to 1947, the division was located at two other locations:

- 1395 Lake Shore Boulevard West: 1926–1959
  - home to Sea Cadet Corps and the Navy League of Canada (RCSCC Vanguard merged with RCSCC Haida, Ark Royal and the Navy League Wrenettes Corps in 1958) until 1959
  - sold Rameses Shrine Temple which remained here until 1983 when it became home to the Royal Canadian Legion Branch 344
- Canadian National Exhibition Automotive Building: 1942–1947

HMCS York moved to its current location in 1959.

== Band ==
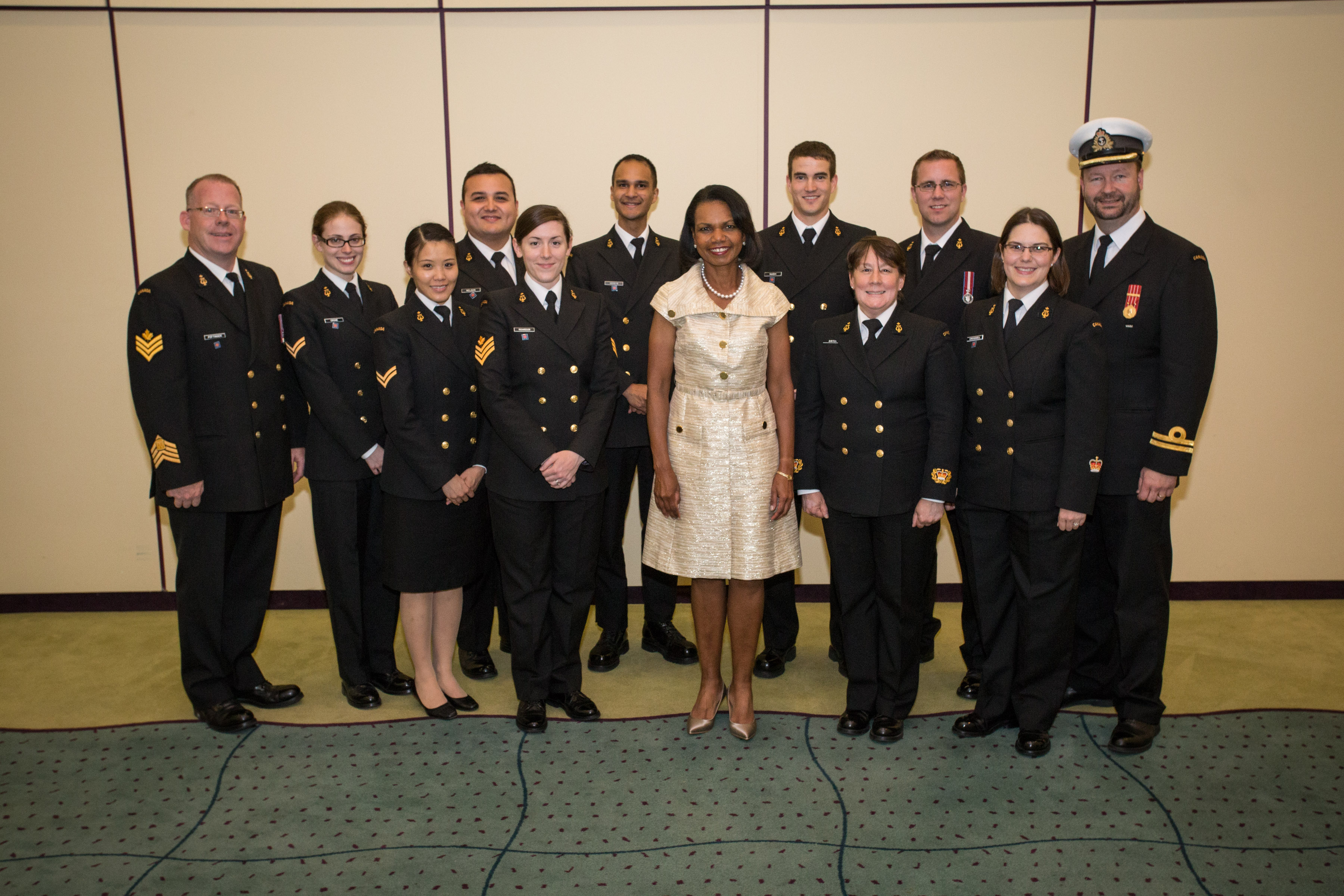
A small ensemble from HMCS York Band with Condoleezza Rice in Toronto, June 2013.

HMCS York parades one of the six Canadian Forces Naval Reserve Ship's Bands in Canada. The band is a professional brass and reed band with approximately 30 members. Their primary operational and training period is from September to May.

The band is composed of the following assets:

- Brass quintet
- Jazz combos
- Big Band
- Concert Band
- Parade Band
- Soloists

It was formed in 1939 from the a Naval School of Music that was established at HMCS York by Lieutenant Commander Alfred Zeally (who is today regarded as the "Father of the Royal Canadian Navy bands"). A notable director of the band includes Robert Hartford Plunkett, who served as the band director in its early years as an official reserve band.

== Badge ==
Description: Azure a white rose of York rayonne Or.

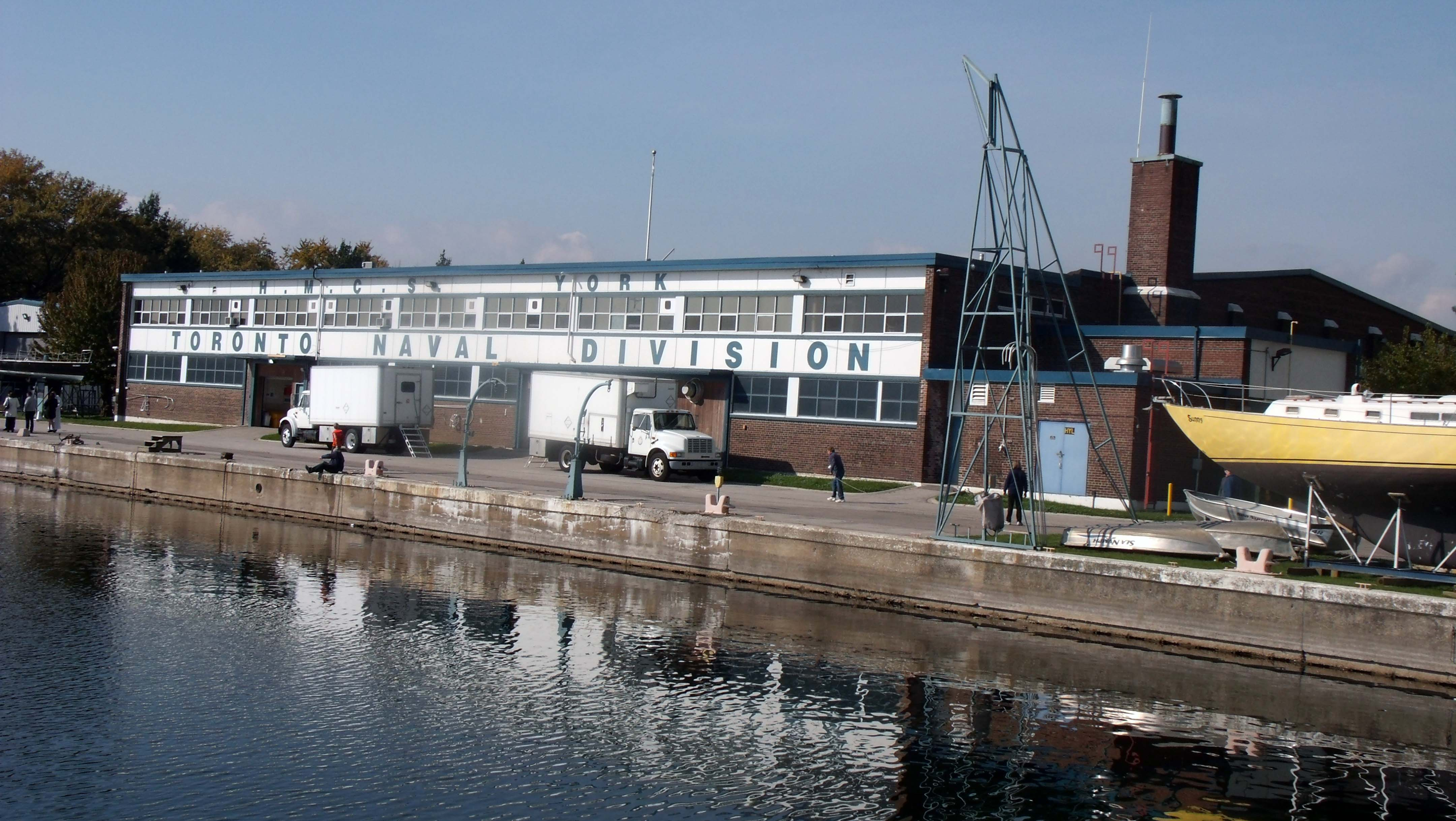
HMCS York Facilities

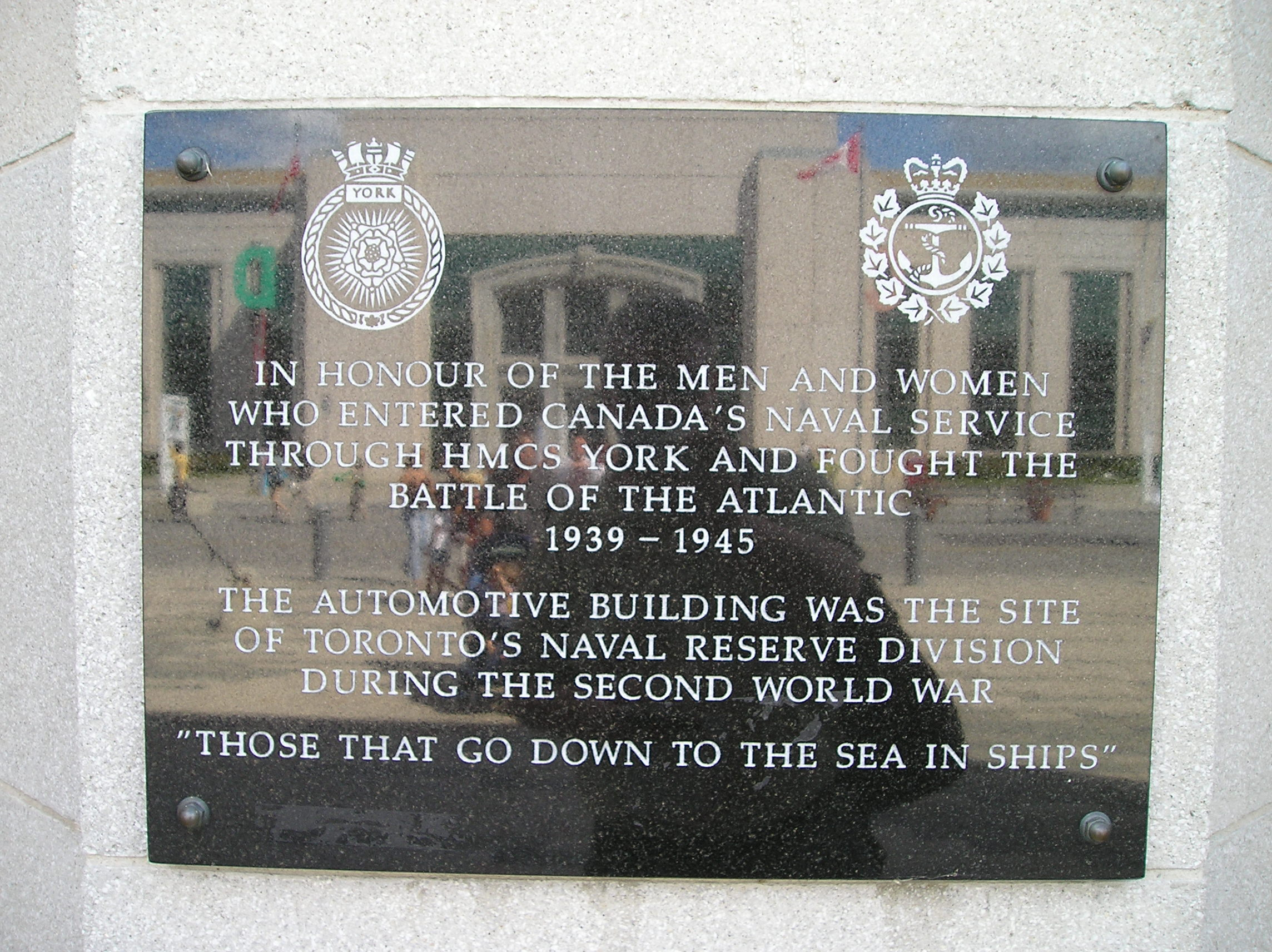
HMCS York plaque at the Canadian National Exhibition grounds in Toronto

Significance: HMCS York was named after the original name of the City of Toronto and the first British commercial craft on Lake Ontario. The badge design was designed by the Admiralty who granted its use as the ship's badge for York.

== Personnel ==
HMCS York serves as a Naval Reserve Division with more than 350 full-time and part-time naval personnel. The current Commanding Officer is Commander Paul Smith, MSM, CD.

Lodger units at HMCS York:

- Naval Reserve air squadron, VC 920: 1953–1963.
- 18 Royal Canadian Sea Cadet Corps Vanguard: 1958–present.
- 618 "Queen City" Royal Canadian Air Cadet Squadron: January 10, 1956 – present.

== Notable former members ==
- Leading Seaman Robert Binder MB, recipient of the Medal of Bravery.
- Lieutenant(N) Chris Devita MB, CD, recipient of the Medal of Bravery.
- Captain(N) Peter C. Newman CC, CD, author of non-fiction Canadiana (mainly in the field of business) and former editor of The Toronto Star and Maclean's.
