= Mercury Club =

Coordinates: 43.65517°N 79.37879°W

The Mercury Club was a night club that first opened on Dundas Street, near Bay Street, in Toronto, and then moved to 221 Victoria St. Harry Eckler of the Canadian Baseball Hall of Fame was one of the owners of the Mercury Club, along with Joe Krol of the Football Hall of Fame and Sam Luftspring of the Boxing Hall of Fame.

It was a very successful club, which saw top acts such as Henny Youngman, Vic Damone, Tony Bennett, Dick Clark, Billy Daniels and many more. It was also a starting point for many local musicians and entertainers who got their professional start during the 1950s and included such local and Canadian artists as Norma Brooks, The Viscounts Quartet, Marilyn Reddick, The Four Lads, the Four Sounds and others.

In the 70s, Guyanese musician Dave Martins acquired the club, called it We Place, but was still locally known as the Mercury Club. It became home to his West Indian band the Tradewinds.
