= Teddy Morris =

Canadian professional football player and coach

Profile
- Positions: Running back, Flying wing

Personal information
- Born: March , 1910; Toronto, Ontario, Canada
- Died: September 5, 1965 (aged 55); Malton, Ontario, Canada

Career information
- College: Toronto

Career history

Playing
- 1931–1939: Toronto Argonauts

Coaching
- 1940–1941: Toronto Argonauts (assistant)
- 1942–1944: HMCS York Navy team
- 1945–1949: Toronto Argonauts
- 1960: Toronto Argonauts

Awards and highlights
- 6× Grey Cup champion; 3× as player: (1933, 1937, 1938); 3× as coach: (1945, 1946, 1947); Jeff Russel Memorial Trophy (1937); 5× All-Eastern (1933, 1934, 1935, 1936, 1938); Canada's Sports Hall of Fame (1975); All-Time Argo (1998)
- Canadian Football Hall of Fame (Class of 1965)

Allan Byron (Teddy) Morris (March 1910 – September 5, 1965) was a Canadian Football Hall of Fame player and coach for the Toronto Argonauts.

Morris began playing Canadian football with Toronto playground teams and moved on to the Winnipeg Native Sons junior football team. Upon his return to Toronto he joined the Argonauts junior squad and quickly earned a spot on the senior team. He was a star player for the Argonauts for nine years and was named All-Eastern running back three times and flying wing twice and named the 1937 Jeff Russel Memorial Trophy winner as the player who best exemplified skill, sportsmanship, and courage in the Interprovincial Rugby Football Union.

Morris' recovery of an Argonauts' punt blocked by Winnipeg's Bud Marquardt in the 25th Grey Cup is often cited as the first of the fabled "Argos Bounces" as it bounced off the field and right into Morris' hands preventing a Blue Bomber possession deep in Argos territory.

In 1940, the year following his last game as a player, Morris began as a backfield coach for the Argonauts then, during IRFU's break from playing during the Second World War, coached HMCS York's football team, and upon IRFU's return to play in 1945, became Argonauts head coach earning three consecutive Grey Cups from 1945 to 1947 and respect from fans and players alike. Morris briefly returned to the Argonauts in 1960 as assistant coach to Lou Agase, having been brought in to help the American acclimatize to Canadian football.

== Awards, honours, and records ==
- The Teddy Morris Memorial Trophy is the championship trophy of the Ontario Football Conference of the Canadian Junior Football League.
- The Ted Morris Memorial Trophy is awarded to the Most Valuable Player of the CIS football Vanier Cup championship game.
- awarded the Jeff Russel Memorial Trophy in 1937 as the player who best exemplified skill, sportsmanship, and courage in the Interprovincial Rugby Football Union.
- named All-Eastern running back in 1933, 1934, and 1936.
- named All-Eastern flying wing in 1935 and 1938.
- merited Canadian Football Hall of Fame as both a player and a builder (1964)
- inducted into Canada's Sports Hall of Fame in 1975
- named an All-Time Argo in 1998.
