= Danny Nykoluk =

Canadian professional football player

No. 60
- Position: Offensive tackle

Personal information
- Born: June 16, 1933; Toronto, Ontario, Canada
- Died: July 29, 2016 (aged 83); Oshawa, Ontario, Canada
- Listed height: 6 ft 3 in (1.91 m)
- Listed weight: 250 lb (113 kg)

Career information
- College: Scarborough College

Career history
- 1954: Toronto Balmy Beach Beachers
- 1955: Toronto Argonauts
- 1957–1971: Toronto Argonauts

Awards and highlights
- 2× CFL East All-Star (1967, 19690; Toronto Argonauts No. 60 retired

Danny Nykoluk (June 16, 1933 – July 29, 2016) was a professional football player with the Canadian Football League's Toronto Argonauts. Nykoluk primarily played the offensive tackle position with the Argos.

Nykoluk played in 204 games with the Argonauts in a career that lasted 16 seasons. His #60 jersey is one of only four that has been retired by the club. In 1996, Nykoluk was inducted as an All-Time Argonaut with a banner named in his honour raised at Rogers Centre.

Danny Nykoluk was the older brother of former Toronto Maple Leafs ice hockey player and NHL coach, Mike Nykoluk.

He died in Oshawa on 29 July 2016 at the age of 83.
