= Mike Nykoluk =

Canadian ice hockey player and coach (1934–2022)

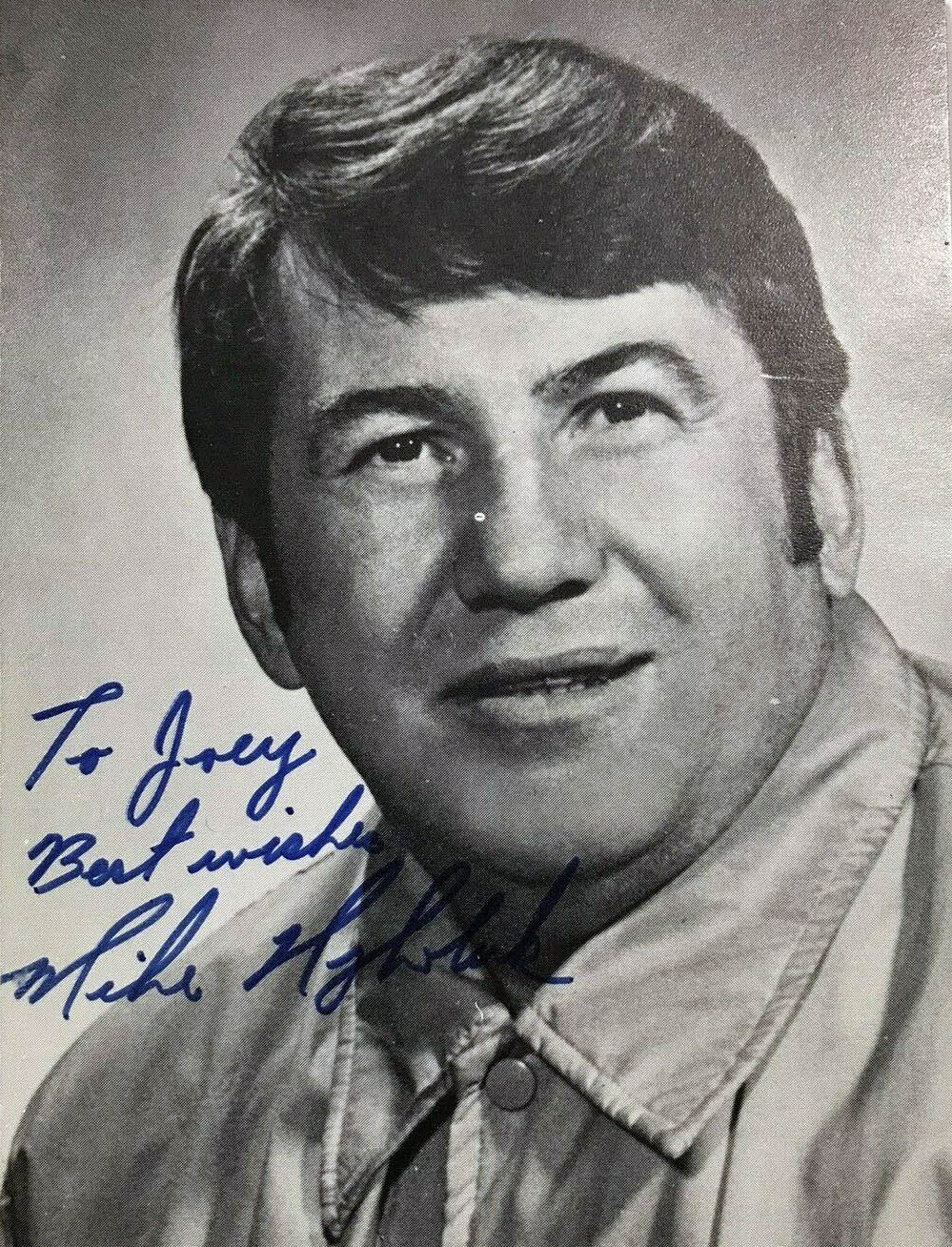
- Nykoluk during his tenure as coach of the Philadelphia Flyers
- Born: December 11, 1934 Toronto, Ontario, Canada
- Died: January 31, 2022 (aged 87) Naples, Florida, U.S.
- Height: 5 ft 11 in (180 cm)
- Weight: 209 lb (95 kg; 14 st 13 lb)
- Position: Centre
- Shot: Right
- Played for: Toronto Maple Leafs
- Coached for: Toronto Maple Leafs
- Playing career: 1955–1972
- Coaching career: 1972–1984

Michael Andrew Nykoluk (December 11, 1934 – January 31, 2022) was a Canadian professional ice hockey player and coach. He played 32 games in the National Hockey League (NHL) for the Toronto Maple Leafs in 1956–57. The rest of his playing career, which lasted from 1955 to 1972, was spent in the minor leagues. He became the first assistant coach in the NHL and won the Stanley Cup in that capacity with the Philadelphia Flyers in 1974 and 1975, before serving as the Maple Leafs head coach from 1981 to 1984. He was the younger brother of longtime Canadian Football League player Danny Nykoluk.

== Early life ==
Nykoluk was born in Toronto on December 11, 1934. He played ice hockey and Canadian football when he was in high school. He began his junior career in 1953–54 with the Toronto Marlboros of the Ontario Hockey Association. He was part of the team that won the 1955 Memorial Cup, scoring 13 points in 10 games in the playoffs that year.

== Playing career ==
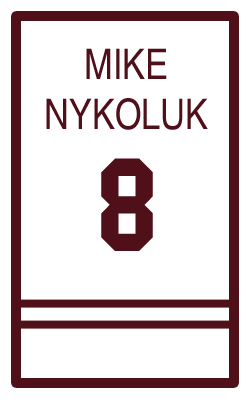
The Hershey Bears retired Nykoluk's No. 8 in recognition of his 14 years of service to the team.

Nykoluk began his professional career with the Rochester Americans of the American Hockey League (AHL) during their inaugural season in 1956–57. In the middle of that season, he was called up to play in the National Hockey League (NHL) for the Toronto Maple Leafs. The 32 games he played for Toronto, in which he scored four points, would be his only stint in the NHL. He was sent back down to the Americans and was subsequently traded with Ron Hurst to the Hershey Bears in exchange for Willie Marshall.

Nykoluk went on to have a 14-season career with the Bears, during which the team won two Calder Cup championships (1959 and 1969). He led the league twice in assists and amassed 50 or more assists in seven consecutive seasons (1963 to 1970). He was named to the AHL All-Star Second Team in 1967 and was conferred the Les Cunningham Award at the end of the year as the league's most valuable player. Nykoluk proceeded to hit a career-high 19 goals and 85 points the following season and was consequently selected for the AHL All-Star First Team. He eventually retired from playing in 1972.

Nykoluk's number 8 was later retired by the Bears. He was part of the second class inducted into the AHL Hall of Fame in 2007. At the time of his death, he was the Bears' all-time leader in games played (972), assists (636), and points (808). He was also third in the AHL all-time in assists (686), sixth in points (881), and fifth in games played (1,069).

== Coaching career ==
After his playing career ended, Nykoluk was offered a job with the Philadelphia Flyers as an assistant to head coach Fred Shero. He became the first full-time assistant coach in the NHL. During his tenure, the Flyers won the Stanley Cup in 1974 and 1975. He subsequently became an assistant to head coach Shero with the New York Rangers, and later served as head coach of the Toronto Maple Leafs for three seasons ending in 1984.

== Personal life ==
Nykoluk was married to Dolly until his death. They met at his sister's wedding, where she was a bridesmaid. Together, they had four children.

After retiring from coaching hockey, Nykoluk and his wife relocated to Naples, Florida, around 1990. He underwent a quadruple bypass surgery in April 2010. Nykoluk died on January 31, 2022, at the age of 87.

== Career statistics ==
=== Regular season and playoffs ===
			Regular season					Playoffs
Season	Team	League	GP	G	A	Pts	PIM	GP	G	A	Pts	PIM
1952–53	Weston Dukes	MetJBHL	—	—	—	—	—	—	—	—	—	—
1953–54	Toronto Marlboros	OHA	59	19	28	47	12	15	2	4	6	4
1954–55	Toronto Marlboros	OHA	47	14	25	39	23	13	3	7	10	17
1954–55	Toronto Marlboros	M-Cup	—	—	—	—	—	10	4	9	13	4
1955–56	Winnipeg Warriors	WHL	70	10	25	35	18	14	10	12	22	7
1956–57	Toronto Maple Leafs	NHL	32	3	1	4	20	—	—	—	—	—
1956–57	Rochester Americans	AHL	28	9	13	22	30	9	3	2	5	4
1957–58	Rochester Americans	AHL	69	14	37	51	45	—	—	—	—	—
1958–59	Hershey Bears	AHL	66	15	38	53	60	13	5	4	9	15
1959–60	Hershey Bears	AHL	71	13	32	45	55	—	—	—	—	—
1960–61	Hershey Bears	AHL	71	10	24	34	14	8	1	5	6	0
1961–62	Hershey Bears	AHL	59	4	20	24	13	7	1	2	3	12
1962–63	Hershey Bears	AHL	72	7	36	43	21	15	1	9	10	2
1963–64	Hershey Bears	AHL	72	9	63	72	39	6	1	3	4	0
1964–65	Hershey Bears	AHL	71	11	55	66	29	15	2	11	13	6
1965–66	Hershey Bears	AHL	67	10	53	63	14	3	0	1	1	0
1966–67	Hershey Bears	AHL	72	16	68	84	26	5	0	4	4	4
1967–68	Hershey Bears	AHL	72	19	66	85	30	5	2	6	8	0
1968–69	Hershey Bears	AHL	74	15	55	70	14	11	0	8	8	0
1969–70	Hershey Bears	AHL	72	16	57	73	12	7	0	2	2	2
1970–71	Hershey Bears	AHL	71	14	39	53	33	4	0	3	3	0
1971–72	Hershey Bears	AHL	62	13	30	43	20	4	0	2	2	4
AHL totals			1069	195	686	881	455	112	16	62	78	49
NHL totals			32	3	1	4	20	—	—	—	—	—

== Coaching record ==
Team	Year	Regular season							Postseason			
Team	Year	G	W	L	T	OTL	Pts	Finish	W	L	Win%	Result
TOR	1980–81	40	15	15	10	—	40	5th in Adams	0	3	.000	Lost in preliminary round (NYI)
TOR	1981–82	80	20	44	16	—	56	5th in Norris	—	—	—	Missed playoffs
TOR	1982–83	80	28	40	12	—	68	3rd in Norris	1	3	.250	Lost in Division Semifinals (MNS)
TOR	1983–84	80	26	45	9	—	61	5th in Norris	—	—	—	Missed playoffs
Total		280	89	144	47	—	225		1	6	.143	2 playoff appearances

== Awards and achievements ==
- Memorial Cup champion (1955)
- Calder Cup (AHL) champion (1959 and 1969)
- AHL Second All-Star Team (1967)
- Les Cunningham Award (AHL) MVP (1967)
- AHL First All-Star Team (1968)
- Stanley Cup champion (1974, 1975; as an assistant coach)

Preceded by Joe Crozier	Head coach of the Toronto Maple Leafs; 1980–1984	Succeeded by Dan Maloney
