= 35th Grey Cup =

1947 Canadian Football championship game

Winnipeg Blue Bombers	Toronto Argonauts
(5–3)	(7–4–1)
9	10
Head coach: Jack West	Head coach: Teddy Morris
	1	2	3	4	Total
Winnipeg Blue Bombers	6	3	0	0	9
Toronto Argonauts	0	1	6	3	10
- Date: November 29, 1947
- Stadium: Varsity Stadium
- Location: Toronto
- Attendance: 18,885

The 35th Grey Cup was played on November 29, 1947, before 18,885 fans at Varsity Stadium at Toronto.

This was the last Grey Cup to be won by a team with all Canadian players.

The Toronto Argonauts defeated the Winnipeg Blue Bombers 10–9. This was the third year in a row that these two teams had met each other for the final game of the season. The game had one of the most exciting finishes in Grey Cup history. Winnipeg had jumped out to a 9 to 0 lead but found the game tied in the last minute. Blue Bomber's all-star Bob Sandberg, who had scored his team's only touchdown, tried to fake a kick, but the ruse didn't work. Argo's star Joe Krol scored a final rouge to snatch the victory. The Argonauts were presented with the Grey Cup, which had survived a fire that year when the Toronto Argonauts Rowing Club building had burned down.
