= Joe Krol =

Player of American and Canadian football (1919–2008)

No. 55
- Position: Quarterback

Personal information
- Born: February 20, 1919; Hamilton, Ontario, Canada
- Died: December 16, 2008 (aged 89); Toronto, Ontario, Canada
- Listed height: 6 ft 0 in (1.83 m)
- Listed weight: 200 lb (91 kg)

Career information
- High school: Kennedy Collegiate Institute

Career history
- Hamilton Flying Wildcats (1942–1944); Detroit Lions (1945); Toronto Argonauts (1945–1952, 1955)

Awards and highlights
- 6× Grey Cup champion (1943, 1945, 1946, 1947, 1950, 1952); Imperial Oil Trophy (ORFU) (1944); Lou Marsh Trophy (1946); Jeff Russel Trophy (1946); 2× Lionel Conacher Award (1946, 1947); 4× All-Eastern RB (1945–1948); Canada's Sports Hall of Fame (1975); Toronto Argonauts No. 55 retired
- Canadian Football Hall of Fame

Joseph "King" Krol (February 20, 1919 – December 16, 2008) was a Canadian football quarterback, running back, defensive back, and placekicker/punter from 1942 to 1953 and 1955. Considered as possibly the most versatile player in Canadian football history as a triple-threat to pass, run, and kick, he was one of Canada's greatest athletes and also famously known as a "Gold Dust Twin" for his teamwork with Royal Copeland. Joe Krol was inducted into the Ontario Sports Hall of Fame in 1996. After suffering from a fall in his apartment, Krol died in a Toronto hospital on December 16, 2008.

== Early life ==
Krol was born on February 20, 1919, in Hamilton, Ontario. He was commonly nicknamed "King". He said in 1999, "My parents are Polish and the name was actually Krul. I guess in Polish, Krol means king. It also means rabbit, but I think I prefer king."

Krol began playing Canadian football in high school at Kennedy Collegiate Institute in Windsor, Ontario in 1932, with which he won several secondary school championships. He went to the University of Western Ontario in London, Ontario and played Intercollegiate Football for the Western Ontario Mustangs from 1938 to 1942 including the Intercollegiate championship in 1939.

== Professional career ==
Krol joined the Hamilton Flying Wildcats, an Ontario Rugby Football Union precursor to the Hamilton Tiger-Cats, following university in 1942. In the 1943 season, he led the Flying Wildcats to a surprise victory to win his first of six Grey Cups. His performance, with a 30-yard pass for a touchdown, a field goal, and a rouge, made him the star of the game. The Wildcats returned to the Grey Cup final in the 1944 season but lost. In that game, Krol fumbled the ball to the St. Hyacinthe-Donnacona Navy team after a hard hit on a run in the second quarter. Krol went on to play two games with the Detroit Lions in 1945 before joining the Toronto Argonauts for the remainder of the 1945 Canadian football season. The Canadian Press voted him Canada's male athlete of the year in 1946 and 1947.

Krol won six Grey Cups, five with the Toronto Argonauts. His No. 55 jersey is one of only four that has been retired by the Boatmen. He was awarded the Lou Marsh Trophy as Canada's top athlete in 1946. He was inducted into the Canadian Football Hall of Fame in 1963 and Canada's Sports Hall of Fame in 1975.

Krol and Royal Copeland (Argonauts and Calgary Stampeders 1944–1956) became known as the Gold Dust Twins. Although official statistics were not kept for the Eastern teams until 1954, according to the 2001 Unofficial Canadian Football Encyclopedia, Krol completed ten passes for 147 yards and threw four touchdowns during the 1946 season.

In November 2006, Krol was voted one of the CFL's top 50 players (No. 46) in a poll conducted by Canadian sports network TSN.

Joe Krol was also one of the owners of the Mercury Night club with Harry Eckler of the Softball Canada Hall of Fame and Sam Luftspring of the Boxing Hall of Fame.
