= 33rd Grey Cup =

1945 Canadian Football championship game

Winnipeg Blue Bombers	Toronto Argonauts
(0–0)	(5–1)
0	35
Head coach: Bert Warwick	Head coach: Teddy Morris
	1	2	3	4	Total
Winnipeg Blue Bombers	0	0	0	0	0
Toronto Argonauts	12	0	12	11	35
- Date: December 1, 1945
- Stadium: Varsity Stadium
- Location: Toronto
- Attendance: 18,660

The 33rd Grey Cup was played on December 1, 1945, before 18,660 fans at Varsity Stadium at Toronto.

The Toronto Argonauts defeated the Winnipeg Blue Bombers 35–0.
