= 34th Grey Cup =

1946 Canadian Football championship game

Winnipeg Blue Bombers	Toronto Argonauts
(5–3)	(7–3–2)
6	28
Head coach: Jack West	Head coach: Teddy Morris
	1	2	3	4	Total
Winnipeg Blue Bombers	0	0	0	6	6
Toronto Argonauts	0	16	6	6	28
- Date: November 30, 1946
- Stadium: Varsity Stadium
- Location: Toronto
- Attendance: 18,960

The 34th Grey Cup was played on November 30, 1946, before 18,960 fans at Varsity Stadium at Toronto.

The Toronto Argonauts defeated the Winnipeg Blue Bombers 28–6.
