= 2020 Canadian honours =

Canadian government recognitions

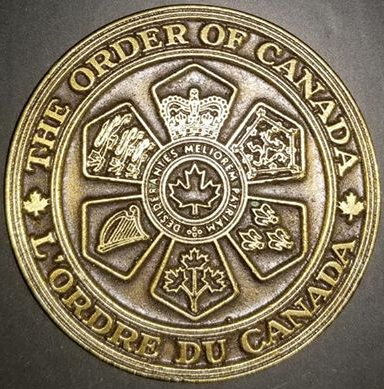
The Seal of the Order of Canada

The following are the appointments to various Canadian Honours of 2020. Usually, they are announced as part of the New Year and Canada Day celebrations and are published within the Canada Gazette during the year. This follows the custom set out within the United Kingdom which publishes its appoints of various British Honours for New Year's and for monarch's official birthday. However, instead of the midyear appointments announced on Victoria Day, the official birthday of the Canadian Monarch, this custom has been transferred with the celebration of Canadian Confederation and the creation of the Order of Canada

However, as the Canada Gazette publishes appointment to various orders, decorations and medal, either Canadian or from Commonwealth and foreign states, this article will reference all Canadians so honoured during the 2020 calendar year.

Provincial Honours are not listed within the Canada Gazette, however they are listed within the various publications of each provincial government. Provincial honours will be listed within this page as they are announced.

== The Order of Canada ==
=== Companions of the Order of Canada ===
Undress ribbon of a Companion of the Order of Canada

- Howard Alper, C.C. (This is a promotion within the Order)
- The Honourable Monique Bégin, P.C., C.C. (This is a promotion within the Order)
- Janette Bertrand, C.C., C.Q. (This is a promotion within the Order)
- Denise Filiatrault, C.C., O.Q. (This is a promotion within the Order)
- Tom Jackson, C.C. (This is a promotion within the Order)
- Thomas King, C.C. (This is a promotion within the Order)
- Phillip James Edwin Peebles, C.C., O.M.
- Mark Roger Tewksbury, C.C., M.S.M.

=== Officers of the Order of Canada ===
Undress ribbon of an Officer of the Order of Canada

- Alice Benjamin, O.C., C.Q.
- Philip Benjamin Berger, O.C., O.Ont.
- Martha Gertrude Muriel Billes, O.C.
- The Honourable William Alexander Blaikie, P.C., O.C.
- Jeffery Dahn, O.C.
- Jan den Oudsten, O.C.
- The Honourable William C. Graham, P.C., O.C., Q.C. (This is a promotion within the order)
- Sandra Kirby, O.C.
- Marcia Vaune Jocelyn Kran, O.C.
- Eugenia Kumacheva, O.C.
- Linda Jane Leith, O.C.
- Sheldon Levy, O.C.
- Claude Meunier, O.C.
- John E. Peller, O.C.
- The Honourable François Rolland, O.C.
- Guy Rouleau, O.C., O.Q.
- John David Runnalls, O.C.
- Sara Seager, O.C.
- Elder Doreen Spence, O.C.
- Marc Tessier-Lavigne, O.C.
- Yosef Wosk, O.C., O.B.C.

=== Honorary Member of the Order of Canada ===
- Alfred E. Slinkard, C.M.

=== Members of the Order of Canada ===
Undress ribbon for a Member of the Order of Canada

- Ella Yoelli Amir, C.M.
- Cristina Amon, C.M.
- Ronald Duncan Barr, C.M.
- Christian Barthomeuf, C.M.
- Chief Darcy Bear, C.M., S.O.M.
- B. Lynn Beattie, C.M.
- Yves Beauchamp, C.M., C.Q.
- Izak Benbasat, C.M.
- Daniel R. Bereskin, C.M., Q.C.
- Judy Birdsell, C.M.
- Max Blouw, C.M.
- Allan Borodin, C.M.
- George Brookman, C.M.
- Alain Chartrand, C.M., C.Q.
- Robert Anthony Clark, C.M.
- Ronald Ivan Cohen, C.M., M.B.E.
- Liliane Colpron, C.M.
- Joseph Michael Connors, C.M.
- Jean Marc Dalpé, C.M.
- B. Denham Jolly, C.M.
- Sandra Djwa, C.M.
- Michel Doucet, C.M., O.N.B., Q.C.
- James M. Drake, C.M.
- Roger Dubois, C.M.
- Donald Gordon Duguid, C.M., O.M.
- Hoda ElMaraghy, C.M., O.Ont.
- Philip Michael Epstein, C.M., O.Ont., Q.C.
- John S. Eyking, C.M.
- William Fast, C.M.
- Edward Finn, C.M.
- Jackie Flanagan, C.M.
- William John Fox, C.M.
- The Honourable Joan Fraser, C.M.
- Timothy Frick, C.M., O.B.C.
- Ross William Glen, C.M.
- Robert Godin, C.M.
- Priscilla Edson Greenwood, C.M.
- David Grimes, C.M.
- Charles Roy Guest, C.M.
- Stanley Hamilton, C.M., O.B.C.
- Anthony Olmsted Hendrie, C.M.
- Carol Pearl Herbert, C.M.
- Gordon Hicks, C.M.
- Jagmohan Humar, C.M.
- Peter Daniel Alexander Jacobs, C.M.
- The Honourable Janis Guðrún Johnson, C.M.
- Maria Labrecque-Duchesneau, C.M., C.Q.
- John R. Lacey, C.M.
- Elizabeth Langley, C.M.
- Gérard Raymond Le Chêne, C.M., C.Q.
- Michele Leering, C.M.
- Jacques Légaré, C.M.
- Elliot Lifson, C.M.
- William Macdonald, C.M.
- Judy Matthews, C.M.
- Harvey Andrew McCue (Waubageshig), C.M.
- Brian McFarlane, C.M.
- Lucy Lynn McIntyre, C.M.
- John H. McNeill, C.M.
- Sarah Milroy, C.M.
- Scott Moir, C.M.
- Menka Nagrani, C.M.
- Jacques Nantel, C.M.
- Peggy Nash, C.M.
- Glenn O'Farrell, C.M.
- Marietta Orlov, C.M. (deceased)
- Marc Parent, C.M.
- Serge Payette, C.M., C.Q.
- Christina Petrowska Quilico, C.M.
- Crystal Pite, C.M.
- Anthony Robin Poole, C.M.
- Brian Postl, C.M., O.M.
- Tom Radford, C.M.
- The Honourable Allan Michael Rock, P.C., C.M., O.Ont., Q.C.
- Lorio Roy, C.M.
- Vera Schiff, C.M.
- Stefan Glenn Sigurdson, C.M., Q.C.
- Lara St. John, C.M.
- Dave William Thomas, C.M.
- Tessa Virtue, C.M.
- Peter Warrian, C.M.
- David P. Wilkinson, C.M.
- Kenneth L. Wilson, C.M.
- Roger Wong, C.M.

== Order of Military Merit ==
=== Commanders of the Order of Military Merit ===
Undress ribbon for a Commander of the Order of Military Merit

- Major-General Peter Samson Dawe, C.M.M., M.S.M., C.D. (This is a promotion within the Order)
- Vice-Admiral Haydn Clyde Edmundson, C.M.M., M.S.M., C.D. (This is a promotion within the Order)
- Major-General Blaise Francis Frawley, C.M.M., C.D. (This is promotion within the Order)
- Major-General Joseph Jean-Marie Jocelyn Paul, C.M.M., M.S.C., C.D.
- Major-General William Francis Seymour, C.M.M., C.D.

=== Officers of the Order of Military Merit ===
Undress ribbon for an Officer of the Order of Military Merit

- Colonel Christopher Charles Ayotte, O.M.M., C.D.
- Brigadier-General Derek Dickson Basinger, O.M.M., C.D.
- Lieutenant-Colonel Lisa Baspaly, O.M.M., C.D.
- Colonel Denis Pierre Gérard Guy Pierre Boucher, O.M.M., C.D.
- Captain(N) Jason Robert Boyd, O.M.M., M.S.M., C.D.
- Lieutenant-Colonel Allan Gregory Dengis, O.M.M., C.D.
- Colonel John William Errington, O.M.M., M.S.M., C.D.
- Commander Deborah-Lynn Gates, O.M.M., C.D.
- Lieutenant-Colonel Dean Paul Gresko, O.M.M., C.D.
- Lieutenant-Colonel Vanessa Maria Hanrahan, O.M.M., C.D.
- Brigadier-General Kevin Gregory Horgan, O.M.M., C.D.
- Colonel Steven James Hunter, O.M.M., M.S.C., M.S.M., C.D.
- Brigadier-General Mario Leblanc, O.M.M., M.S.M., C.D.
- Colonel Dwayne Michael Lemon, O.M.M., M.S.C., C.D.
- Colonel Shawn Lawrence Marley, O.M.M., C.D.
- Colonel John Paul Scott McKenzie, O.M.M., C.D.
- Brigadier-General Mark Misener, O.M.M., M.S.M., C.D.
- Lieutenant-Colonel Heather Suzanne Morrison, O.M.M., C.D.
- Colonel Alan Paul Mulawyshyn, O.M.M., C.D.
- Colonel Denis Paul O'Reilly, O.M.M., C.D.
- Colonel Keith Edward Osmond, O.M.M., C.D.
- Colonel George Bradley Thomson, O.M.M., C.D.

=== Members of the Order of Military Merit ===
Undress ribbon for a Member of the Order of Military Merit

- Ranger Kimberly Ann Andersen, M.M.M., C.D.
- Chief Warrant Officer Richard Robert Biddiscombe, M.M.M., C.D.
- Warrant Officer Daniel Bonhomme, M.M.M., C.D.
- Sergeant Shelley Lynn Boswell, M.M.M., C.D.
- Master Warrant Officer Steve Joseph Roger Alfred Chagnon, M.M.M., C.D.
- Petty Officer 2nd Class Rebecca Michal Charlesworth, M.M.M., C.D.
- Master Warrant Officer Marcel Armand Rheo Chenier, M.M.M., C.D.
- Captain Matthew Paul Clark, M.M.M., C.D.
- Master Warrant Officer Stéphane Cloutier, M.M.M., C.D.
- Chief Warrant Officer Donald Charles Colombe, M.M.M., C.D.
- Warrant Officer Isabelle Marie Réjeanne Corbeil, M.M.M., C.D.
- Chief Warrant Officer Joseph Jacques Marco Côté, M.M.M., C.D.
- Master Warrant Officer Joseph Jonathan Charles Côté, M.M.M., C.D.
- Master Warrant Officer Robin Nicolas Côté, M.M.M., C.D.
- Chief Warrant Officer Mark Steven Delarosbil, M.M.M., C.D.
- Master Warrant Officer Mark Robertson Denney, M.M.M., C.D.
- Warrant Officer Catharine Anne Devlin, M.M.M., C.D.
- Major Daniel Alexandre Doran, M.M.M., C.D.
- Master Warrant Officer Frédéric François Alexandre Duchesneau, M.M.M., C.D.
- Warrant Officer Michael Joseph Dwyer, M.M.M., C.D.
- Chief Petty Officer 2nd Class Peter Kent Ellerbeck, M.M.M., C.D.
- Warrant Officer Martin Falardeau, M.M.M., C.D.
- Warrant Officer Robbie Mark Fraser, M.M.M., C.D.
- Warrant Officer John Peter James Gallagher, M.M.M., M.S.M., C.D.
- Chief Petty Officer 2nd Class Philip Murray Gormley, M.M.M., M.S.M., C.D.
- Chief Warrant Officer Gary Lynden Cliffe Grant, M.M.M., M.S.M., C.D.
- Warrant Officer Audrey Gravelle, M.M.M., C.D.
- Master Warrant Officer Mario Grondin, M.M.M., C.D.
- Ranger Peter Matthew Gull, M.M.M., C.D.
- Petty Officer 1st Class Dana Andrew Joseph Haley, M.M.M., C.D.
- Warrant Officer Justin Kane Harper, M.M.M., C.D.
- Chief Warrant Officer Michele Dawn Harris, M.M.M., C.D.
- Sergeant Joanne Marie Henneberry, M.M.M., C.D.
- Master Warrant Officer Sheldon Wayne Herritt, M.M.M., C.D.
- Petty Officer 1st Class Andy Kirk Raymond Hewlett, M.M.M., C.D.
- Chief Warrant Officer Paul Justin Holwell, M.M.M., C.D.
- Warrant Officer James Adam Hunter, M.M.M., M.S.M., C.D.
- Chief Warrant Officer Graham Andrew James, M.M.M., C.D.
- Master Warrant Officer Anthony Hewitt Jones, M.M.M., C.D.
- Master Warrant Officer Lisa Anne Kachanoski, M.M.M., C.D.
- Warrant Officer James Andrew King, M.M.M., C.D.
- Master Warrant Officer André Lamarre, M.M.M., C.D.
- Master Warrant Officer Daniel Michel Landry, M.M.M., C.D.
- Warrant Officer Danielle Amber Langley, M.M.M., C.D.
- Master Warrant Officer Joel Albert Langley, M.M.M., C.D.
- Warrant Officer Bruno Hugo Lapointe, M.M.M., C.D.
- Chief Warrant Officer Joseph Serge Rémy Lapointe, M.M.M., C.D.
- Chief Warrant Officer Grant Lawson, M.M.M., C.D.
- Lieutenant Martin Claude Le Blanc, M.M.M., C.D.
- Major Erica Anne Lidington, M.M.M.
- Chief Petty Officer 2nd Class Tari Lyn Lightwood, M.M.M., C.D.
- Master Warrant Officer Robert Dave Limon, M.M.M., C.D.
- Sergeant Christina Lee Marie Litschel, M.M.M., C.D.
- Petty Officer 2nd Class Derek Lewis Lougher-Goodey, M.M.M., C.D.
- Chief Warrant Officer Mary Margaret MacDonald, M.M.M., C.D.
- Sergeant Réjean Joseph Lucien Martel, M.M.M., C.D.
- Master Warrant Officer Michael John Martens, M.M.M., C.D.
- Warrant Officer Liam Robert McGlynn, M.M.M., C.D.
- Warrant Officer Mark Meyer, M.M.M., C.D.
- Chief Warrant Officer Abdul Hafeez Mullick, M.M.M., C.D.
- Chief Warrant Officer Derek Howard Murphy, M.M.M., C.D.
- Master Warrant Officer Allana Mary Nicholas, M.M.M., C.D.
- Chief Warrant Officer Charles August O'Donnell, M.M.M., C.D.
- Major Sheldon Ernest Penney, M.M.M., C.D.
- Petty Officer 1st Class Nelson Pinherio Pereira, M.M.M., C.D.
- Master Warrant Officer Bruno Plamondon, M.M.M., C.D.
- Petty Officer 1st Class Pierre-Luc Joseph Reynold Poirier-Potvin, M.M.M., C.D.
- Warrant Officer Sheldon Charles Quinn, M.M.M., C.D.
- Sergeant Christopher William Rambharose, M.M.M., S.M.V., C.D.
- Master Warrant Officer Shane Wilson Ringer, M.M.M., C.D.
- Major Jean Pascal Roy, M.M.M., C.D.
- Warrant Officer Joseph Aaron Schamerhorn, M.M.M., C.D.
- Master Warrant Officer Incoronata Scuncio, M.M.M., C.D.
- Chief Warrant Officer Donna Louise Smit, M.M.M., C.D.
- Captain Gregory Allan Smit, M.M.M., S.C., M.S.M., C.D.
- Petty Officer 1st Class Cecil Jason Sparkes, M.M.M., S.C., C.D.
- Master Warrant Officer Ryan David Stout, M.M.M., C.D.
- Lieutenant(N) Michael Thomas St-Pierre, M.M.M., C.D.
- Sergeant Stacy Lynn Taylor, M.M.M.
- Master Warrant Officer Travis Urban Trussler, M.M.M., C.D.
- Petty Officer 1st Class Darcy Louise Webb, M.M.M., C.D.
- Warrant Officer Danielle Mary Winters, M.M.M., C.D.
- Master Warrant Officer Joseph Charles Eugène Jonathan Lacoste, M.M.M., C.D.

== Order of Merit of the Police Forces ==
=== Commander of the Order of Merit of the Police Forces ===
Undress ribbon of a Commander of the Order of Merit of the Police Forces

- Chief Constable Anthony Adam Palmer, C.O.M. - This is a promotion within the Order

=== Officers of the Order of Merit of the Police Forces ===
Undress ribbon of an Officer of the Order of Merit of the Police Forces

- Inspector Lisa Byrne, O.O.M.
- Commissioner Thomas W. B. Carrique, O.O.M. - This is a promotion within the Order
- Deputy Chief Shawna Michelle Coxon, O.O.M.
- Chief Wayne Gerard Gallant, O.O.M. - This is a promotion within the Order
- Chief Bryan Michael Larkin, O.O.M. - This is a promotion within the Order
- Deputy Chief Robin Emmanuel McNeil, O.O.M. - This is a promotion within the Order
- Chief Paul E. Pedersen, O.O.M.- This is a promotion within the Order
- Deputy Chief Constable Satwinder Rai, O.O.M. - This is a promotion within the Order
- Assistant Commissioner Stephanie Marie Sachsse, O.O.M.
- Provincial Commander Mary Ann Silverthorn, O.O.M. - This is a promotion within the Order
- Inspector Clare Elizabeth Smart, O.O.M.
- Chief Constable Leslie John Sylven, O.O.M. - This is a promotion within the Order

=== Honorary Member of the Order of Merit of the Police Forces ===
- Colonel Giorgio Tommaseo, M.O.M.

=== Members of the Order of Merit of the Police Forces ===
Undress ribbon of a Member of the Order of Merit of the Police Forces

- Superintendent Steven Channing Barlow, M.O.M.
- Inspector Christopher D. Barry, M.O.M.
- Deputy Director Simonetta Barth, M.O.M.
- Corporal Eugene J. L. Belliveau, M.O.M.
- Superintendent Thomas E. Berczi, M.O.M.
- Chief Superintendent Rhonda M. Blackmore, M.O.M.
- Detective Michael Alexander Cavilla, M.O.M.
- Assistant Commissioner Bernadine Arlene Chapman, M.O.M.
- Deputy Chief André Crawford, M.O.M.
- Assistant Commissioner Brian Francis Edwards, M.O.M.
- Chief Scott S. Gilbert, M.O.M.
- Sergeant Sandra Glendinning, M.O.M.
- Chief Superintendent Michael J. Good, M.O.M.
- Chief Superintendent Janis Bernadette Gray, M.O.M.
- Corporal David Paul Lane, M.O.M., C.D.
- Ms. Nadine A. Langlois, M.O.M.
- Director Francis Lanouette, M.O.M.
- Constable Richard Lavallee, M.O.M.
- Chief Superintendent Ian David Lawson, M.O.M.
- Superintendent Mark Le Page, M.O.M.
- Mr. Christopher Marc Lett, M.O.M.
- Chief Terry R. McCaffrey, M.O.M.
- Superintendent Colleen Anne McCormick, M.O.M.
- Reverend Thomas S. McCullagh, M.O.M.
- Deputy Chief Barbara McLean, M.O.M.
- Chief Superintendent Shahin Mehdizadeh, M.O.M.
- Mr. Gary V. Melanson, M.O.M.
- Superintendent William D. Merrylees, M.O.M.
- Superintendent Larry David Montgomery, M.O.M.
- Inspector Glenn Newman, M.O.M.
- Sergeant Major Douglas Selby Pack, M.O.M.
- Staff Sergeant Ronald B. Parker, M.O.M.
- Superintendent Jason Walter Popik, M.O.M.
- Deputy Chief Dean R. Rae, M.O.M.
- Superintendent Elija Andrew Rain, M.O.M.
- Superintendent Gary Douglas Ross, M.O.M.
- Deputy Director Sophie Roy, M.O.M.
- Deputy Chief Jeffery Skye, M.O.M.
- Director Simmie Smith, M.O.M.
- Superintendent Grant Martin Ezra St. Germaine, M.O.M.
- Constable John David Stewart, M.O.M.
- Deputy Chief Kevin Thaler, M.O.M.
- Inspector Sharon Barbara Warren, M.O.M.
- Deputy Chief Sheilah Weber, M.O.M.
- Superintendent Fiona Wilson, M.O.M.
- Inspector Colleen Yee, M.O.M.

== Most Venerable Order of the Hospital of St. John of Jerusalem ==
Undress ribbon for all grades of the Most Venerable Order of the Hospital of St. John of Jerusalem

=== Dame Grand Cross ===
- Mairi Christina Arthur

=== Knights and Dames of the Order of St. John ===
- Jean Kathryn Chute
- Lynn M. Cook
- David James Hook
- Alain Louis Joseph Laurencelle
- His Honour the Honourable Russell Mirasty, M.S.M.
- Her Honour the Honourable Brenda Murphy, O.N.B.

=== Commanders of the Order of St. John ===
- Mary Kingston
- Kim Juanita Laing
- Christopher Paul McCreery, M.V.O.
- Kevin R. Morgan
- Raymond Ormerod
- Lieutenant Colonel Victor Rodney Paddon, O.M.M., C.D. (Retired)
- The Reverend Canon Christopher Bennett Jethro Pratt

=== Officers of the Order of St. John ===
- Peter Harvey Dwight Blok
- Patricia Coleman
- James Daniel Coucill
- Sergeant Stephane Joseph Emillien Gagne, C.D.
- Dianne Gail Hennig, C.D.
- Cindy Carol Maitre
- J. Francis Malley
- Jonathan William Peppler
- John Gregory Peters, M.V.O.
- John Michael Prno
- Marsha E. Seens
- Andrew Wright Stanzel
- Margaret Wynn Wicklum
- Steve Wai-Kit Woo

=== Members of the Order of St. John ===
- Elizabeth Mary Anderson
- Edward Michael Barner
- Peter Ian Beliveau
- Judith Ann Bell
- Susan Melissa Bendzak
- Nancy Catherine Berlett
- Lindsay Blanchette
- Gaby William Boutin
- Christopher Richard Brooks
- Lois Brown
- Henry Ying Fun Chow
- Michael Cohen
- Carine Couturier
- Debbie Edith Crozier
- Lhea Dawn Davidson
- Heather Joy De Santis
- Wendy Mae Donaldson
- Lieutenant-Colonel Robert Francis Elliott, O.M.M., C.D. (Retired)
- Robin Bruce Farquhar
- Paul Filkiewicz
- Catherine Joy Fletcher
- Brent James Fowler
- Adrienne Lorelle Ganton
- Donald James Garrish
- Gregory John Garrish
- Gabrielle Gendreau
- André-Claude Gendron
- Dallas Kent James Green
- Ghislain Guay
- Rayna Vale Hamilton
- John MacDonald Harper
- Major Ernest Francis Hughes, C.D. (Retired)
- Nicholas James Hume
- Martha Susan Keller
- Christine Esther Bujold Lacombe
- Brenda Elizabeth Lawson
- Denis Leblanc
- Jacob John Lee
- Beverly Anne Luiken
- Edward Ma
- Craig Leslie Mantle
- Marilyn Elaine Martin
- William Gordon McDonald
- Jane Elizabeth McIntosh
- Deborah Catherine McLay
- Paul Glenn McLay
- Kellyann Tekarihwenháiwi Meloche
- William John Mewhort
- Alain Miclette
- Chaneen Nomek Miller
- Manuel A. Montero, C.D.
- Tessa Morelli
- Martin Parent
- Amanda Morrison-Penny
- Paul Eric Pederson, M.O.M.
- Douglas James Penner, C.D.
- Patrice Olivier Jean-Marc Pinard-Dostie
- Barbara Jean Poison
- Major Alphonse Proulx (Retired)
- Francois Provost
- Anne Ramsoomair
- Diana Lynn Randall
- Jerry Lyall Rankin
- Joshua Louis Reitzel
- Geraldine Elizabeth Redmond
- Madeleine Mary Robertson
- Sarah Schorno
- Anna Stefek
- Captain Christian Stenner, C.D.
- Sheilagh Elizabeth Stewart
- Johanne St-Germain
- Pier-Luc Vocal
- Anna-Maria Gayle White
- Amanda Leota Wood

== Provincial honours ==
=== National Order of Quebec ===
==== Grand Officer ====
- Guy Rocher

==== Officers ====
- Renaldo Battista
- Ivan Bernier
- Guy Breton
- Sophie Brochu
- Brian Bronfman
- Louise Caouette-Laberge
- Fernand Dansereau
- Jean-Pierre Ménard
- Serge Ménard
- Suzanne Sauvage
- David Saint-Jacques
- Jean-Marc Vallée
- Jean-P. Vezina

==== Knights ====
- Steve Barakatt
- Louis Bernatchez
- Charles Binamé
- Marcel Boyer
- Madeleine Careau
- Guillaume Côté
- Mario Cyr
- Gaston Déry
- Claire Deschênes
- Johanne Elsener
- Anne-Marie Hubert
- Florence Junca-Adenot
- Louise Latraverse
- Andrew Molson
- Ali Nestor
- Michèle Ouimet
- Morag Park
- Claude Provencher
- Jennifer Stoddart
- Sophie Thibault
- Sylvie Vachon

=== Saskatchewan Order of Merit ===
Undress ribbon for a member of the Saskatchewan Order of Merit

- Dr. Gordon Asmundson
- Rigmor Clarke
- Sally Elliott
- Gerald Grandey
- Dr. Donald Greve
- Dr. Lorne Hepworth
- Pamela Klein
- Silvia Martini
- Eloise Sitter
- Dr. Walter Streelasky

=== Order of Ontario ===
- Daniel Allen
- Dr. Joseph Raymond Buncic, C.M.
- Michael DeGasperis
- Dr. Raymond Desjardins
- Ernest Eves, Q.C.
- Hershell Ezrin
- Carlo Fidani
- Karen Goldenberg
- Michael Deane Harris
- Ellis Jacob, C.M.
- Dr. Jing Jiang
- Dr. Shana O. Kelley
- Dr. André Lapierre
- Dale Lastman, C.M.
- André M. Levesque
- Dr. Peter Liu
- Hazel McCallion, C.M.
- Arden McGregor
- Janet McKelvy
- George McLean
- Hon. Rosemary Moodie
- Hon. Bob Runciman
- Dr. Marilyn Sonley
- Ahmad Reza Tabrizi
- Hon. Karen M. Weiler, C.M.

=== Order of British Columbia ===
Undress ribbon for a member of the Order of British Columbia

- Shashi Assanand
- Ryan Beedie
- Michael Bublé, O.C.
- Shirley Chan
- Neil Cook, M.G.C.
- Paul George
- Rusty Goepel
- John Malcolm Horton
- Dr. Mel Krajden
- Dr. Janet Nadine Mort
- Tracy Porteous
- Carole Taylor, O.C.
- Ruth Williams

=== Alberta Order of Excellence ===
Undress ribbon for a member of the Alberta Order of Excellence

- JudyLynn Archer
- Jim Boucher
- Charlie Fischer (posthumous)
- Frances Harley
- John Mah
- Holger Petersen
- Ed Stelmach

=== Order of Prince Edward Island ===
Undress ribbon for a member of the Order of Prince Edward Island

- Olive Bryanton
- Henry Purdy
- B.E. "Bev" Simpson

=== Order of Manitoba ===
Undress ribbon for a member of the Order of Manitoba

- Dr. Stephen Borys
- Mitch Bourbonniere
- Elder Mary Courchene
- Dr. Krishnamurti Dakshinamurti
- Bill Elliott
- Richard Frost
- Tina Jones
- Dr. Marion Lewis, O.C.
- Margaret Morse
- Stuart Murray
- Scott Oake
- Dr. Ernest Rady

=== Order of New Brunswick ===
Undress ribbon for a member of the Order of New Brunswick

- Patricia Bernard
- Héliodore Côté
- Michel Doucet
- Léo Johnson
- Lois Scott
- Robyn Tingley
- Abraham Beverley Walker
- James "Jim" Wilson
- Claire Wilt
- John Wood

=== Order of Nova Scotia ===
Undress ribbon for a member of the Order of Nova Scotia

- Linda Best
- Stella Bowles
- David G. Fountain, C.M.
- Natalie MacMaster, C.M.
- The Hon. Dr. Donald Oliver, C.M., Q.C.
- Shawna Y. Paris-Hoyte

=== Order of Newfoundland and Labrador ===
Undress ribbon for a member of the Order of Newfoundland and Labrador

No appointments were made during 2020 due to the COVID-19 pandemic.

== Territorial honours ==
=== Order of Nunavut ===
Undress ribbon for a member of the Order of Nunavut

The Order of Nunavut was not awarded in 2020.

=== Order of the Northwest Territories ===
Undress ribbon for a member of the Order of Northwest Territories

The Order of the Northwest Territories was not awarded in 2020.

=== Order of Yukon ===
Undress ribbon for a member of the Order of Yukon

- Bess Cooley
- Keith Byram
- Doug Phillips
- Jack Cable
- William Klassen
- Frances Woolsey
- Dr. Sally MacDonald
- Gertie Tom
- Agnes Mills
- The Hon. Ron Veale

== Canadian Bravery Decorations ==
=== Star of Courage ===
- Aaron Grant Gibbons (posthumous)

=== Medal of Bravery ===
- Constable Marc-André Arpin
- Constable Annie Arseneau
- Constable Kyle Aucoin
- Irene Margaret Bell
- Commander Patrice Bigras
- Kyle Busquine
- Julio Cabrera
- Julie Callaghan
- Constable Jeffrey Czarnecki
- Sandra Desnomie
- Jehangir Faisal
- Constable Jimmy Hébert
- Yvonne Kanis
- Christopher Ellis Lawless
- Adam Matson
- Daniel Joseph McKinney
- Max Milan
- Constable Paul Morin
- Constable Marco Pagliericci
- Constable Danny Paquette
- Edward Reese
- Stephen Ross
- Bradley Schroeder
- Jonathan Stein-Palmiere (posthumous)
- Emilie Stevens
- Sergeant Hughes Thibault
- Keiren J. Tompkins
- Mark Oscar Tuura
- Dwayne Voth
- Sylvain Beauchamp
- Charlie Brien
- Constable Daryl Case
- Debbra Cooper
- Kimberly Cossette
- Jacob Fournier-Barnaby
- Constable Jean-Philip Gagnon
- Régis Grégoire
- Kai Hirvonen
- Christopher McManus-Lowson
- Peter Slipp
- Chris Scott
- Sébastien Vallerand
- Constable Stéphane Veilleux
- Constable David Wynn (posthumous)

== Meritorious Service Decorations ==
=== Meritorious Service Cross (Military Division) ===
- Brigadier-General Joseph Raymond Marc Gagné, O.M.M., M.S.M., C.D.
- Colonel Robert Brian Irwin, C.D.
- Lieutenant-Colonel Steven Kelly MacBeth, M.S.M., C.D.
- Colonel Christopher Alan McKenna, O.M.M., M.S.M., C.D.
- Lieutenant-Colonel Christopher Wayne Morrison, C.D.
- Admiral James G. Foggo III of the United States Navy

=== Meritorious Service Cross (Civil Division) ===
- Nahid Aboumansour, C.Q., M.S.C.
- Ian M. F. Arnold, M.S.C.
- Darcy Ataman, M.S.C.
- Robert T. Banno, M.S.C. (deceased)
- Kathryn Marie Blain, M.S.C.
- Sandy Boutin, M.S.C.
- Franca Damiani Carella, M.S.C. (posthumous)
- Henry Gourdji, M.S.C., C.D.
- Mackie Terris Greene, M.S.C.
- Joseph Michael Howlett, M.S.C. (posthumous)
- Harry Ing, M.S.C.
- Nicole Marcil-Gratton, C.Q., M.S.C. (posthumous)
- Matthew Pearce, M.S.C.
- Jonathan Pitre, M.S.C. (posthumous)
- Grégory Sadetsky, M.S.C.
- Byron Smith, M.S.C.
- Wanda vanderStoop, M.S.C.
- Michèle Viau-Chagnon, C.Q., M.S.C.

=== Second Award of the Meritorious Service Medal (Military Division) ===
Colonel Joshua James Major, M.S.M., C.D.

=== Meritorious Service Medal (Military Division) ===
- Major Mathieu Liam Chêne Arseneault, C.D.
- Sergeant Marc-André Joseph Jacques Bastille
- Warrant Officer Marcel Yan Boursier, M.M.M., C.D.
- Master Seaman Rebecca Michal Charlesworth, C.D.
- Chief Warrant Officer John Castel Copeland, M.M.M., C.D.
- Commander Nathan George Decicco, C.D.
- Major Cullen Patrick Downey, C.D.
- Warrant Officer Marc Joseph Claude Gérard Dumont, C.D.
- Major Alexander Stewart Duncan, C.D.
- Petty Officer 2nd Class Justin Robert Dale Furman, C.D.
- Chief Warrant Officer Vincent Ronald Gagnon, M.M.M., C.D.
- Major Joseph Marie Marc Yan Gauthier, C.D.
- Major Patrick Clancy Gilbride
- Lieutenant-Colonel Marie Aimée Julie Grand'Maison, C.D.
- Lieutenant(N) Frederick Raymond Joseph, C.D.
- Lieutenant-Colonel Kieran Keith Kennedy, C.D.
- Lieutenant-Colonel James Timothy Kenney, C.D.
- Lieutenant-Colonel Joshua Andrew Klemen, C.D.
- Ordinary Seaman Frédéric Lapointe
- Lieutenant-Colonel Pierre Alexandre Leroux, C.D.
- Honorary Captain(N) Mark Roderick McQueen
- Colonel Joseph Laurier Serge Ménard, C.D.
- Chief Warrant Officer Steven Vincent Merry, M.M.M., C.D.
- Chief Warrant Officer Justin Francis Morneau, M.M.M., C.D.
- Master Warrant Officer Joseph André Robert Nadeau, C.D.
- Colonel Cayle Ian Oberwarth, C.D.
- Master Seaman Francisco Joaquim Grilo Peredo
- Master Corporal Sébastien Lionel Renaud
- Captain Paul Schouten (Kingdom of the Netherlands)
- Leading Seaman Collin François Damien Maël Johan Teasdale, C.D.
- Major Frank Michael Bird, C.D.
- Sergeant Timothy Jay Blindback, C.D.
- Chief Petty Officer 1st Class Shawn Paul Coates, C.D.
- Lieutenant-Colonel Raphaël Joseph Léon Jocelyn Guay, C.D.
- Lieutenant-Colonel Sonny Thomas Hatton, C.D.
- Colonel Jason Gabriel Langelier, O.M.M., C.D.
- Colonel Joseph Daniel Stéphane Masson, C.D.
- Lieutenant-Colonel Gordon James Peckham, C.D.
- Commander Peter Scott Robinson, C.D.
- Chief Petty Officer 1st Class Daniel Joseph Savard, C.D.
- Brigadier General Daniel Lawrence Simpson of the United States Air Force
- Brigadier-General Nicolas Dan Stanton, O.M.M., C.D.
- Chief Warrant Officer David Charles Tofts, M.M.M., C.D.

=== Meritorious Service Medal (Civil Division) ===
- Adrian Bercovici, M.S.M.
- Natalie Bercovici, M.S.M.
- Yves Ernest Berthiaume, M.S.M.
- Subhas (Sam) Bhargava, M.S.M.
- Uttra Bhargava, M.S.M.
- Tina Boileau, M.S.M.
- Deborrah Sharon Bradwell, M.S.M.
- Kenneth Bradwell, M.S.M. (posthumous)
- Michael Andrew Burns, M.S.C., M.S.M.
- Louise Joanne Foster-Martin, M.S.M.
- John Timothy Goddard, M.S.M.
- Todd Alan Halpern, M.S.M.
- Jim Hayhurst Sr., M.S.M. (posthumous)
- Alexis Kearney Hillyard, M.S.M.
- Mike David Hirschbach, M.S.M.
- Jacques Jean Simon Janson, M.S.M.
- Superintendent Heinz A. J. Kuck, M.S.M. (retired)
- Véronique Leduc, M.S.M.
- Gerard Barry Losier, O.N.B., M.S.M.
- Taylor MacGillivray, M.S.M.
- Alan Melanson, M.S.M.
- Glori Meldrum, M.S.M.
- James Mercer, M.S.M.
- Fred Monk, M.S.M.
- Dean Otto, M.S.M.
- Jeanine Otto, M.S.M.
- Mavis I. Ramsey, M.S.M.
- Ron J. Ramsey, M.S.M.
- Mike Paul Ranta, M.S.M.
- Sylvie Rémillard, M.S.M.
- Kennith James Skwleqs Robertson, M.S.M.
- Catherine Ross, M.S.M.
- Jane Adele Roy, M.S.M.
- Jeremie Saunders, M.S.M.
- James Scott, M.S.M.
- Ariel Shlien, M.S.M.
- Ron Shlien, M.S.M.
- Peter Smyth, M.S.M.
- Brian Matthew Stever, M.S.M.
- Jean-Pierre Tchang, M.S.M.
- Iyabode Lanre Tunji-Ajayi, M.S.M.
- Sylvana Villata-Micillo, M.S.M.

== Mention in Dispatches ==
- Master Corporal Shawn Douglas Orme, C.D.
- Sergeant James Gordon Sanford, C.D.

== Sovereign's Medal for Volunteers ==
- Qapik Attagutsiak
- Lieutenant-Colonel Michael Bisson, C.D.
- John Bryant
- Patricia Cimmeck
- Alan Davidson
- Lieutenant(N) Joseph Dollis, C.D.
- Sean Donohue
- Pearl Dorey
- Dale Drysdale, C.D.
- Gilles Dubé
- Private William Dwyer, C.D.
- Susan Nelson Epstein
- Sean Falle
- Captain Jacques J. Gagne (Ret'd)
- Lisa Gausman
- Theresa Grabowski
- Darrell Helyar
- Gary Hewitt
- Jacquelin Holzman
- Greg Johnson
- Gwendolyn Johnston
- Master Warrant Officer Melissa Kehoe, C.D.
- Lieutenant-Colonel Mark James Levi Kennedy, C.D.
- Lewis Arlo King
- Sylvia Kitching
- Françoise Landry
- Monique Lavallée
- Warren Law
- Roméo Levasseur
- Corporal Brian Lussier, C.D.
- Leslie Anne Macaulay
- Charlene McInnis
- Robert Miller
- Micheline Morin
- Douglas Munroe
- Lieutenant Commander Donna Murakami, C.D.
- Brian North
- Brendan O'Donnell
- Douglas Paul Pflug
- June Raymond
- Jeffrey Smith
- Mark Symington
- Ralph Thomas
- Sharon Faye Thorne
- Richard Tobin
- Patricia Ellen Towell
- Reid Whynot
- Major William Worden, C.D.

== Commonwealth and Foreign Orders, Decorations and Medal awarded to Canadians ==
=== From Her Majesty The Queen in Right of Australia ===
==== Order of Australia ====
===== Officer of the Order of Australia =====
- Karim Khan

===== Member of the Order of Australia =====
- Constance Seagram

==== Australian Operational Service Medal – Border Protection ====
- Major Douglas Publicover
- Major Michael MacSween

=== From Her Majesty The Queen in Right of Jamaica ===
==== Badge of Honour for Meritorious Service ====
- Ms. Marie Hackett
- Ms. Maria Sansait

==== Badge of Honour for Long and Faithful Service ====
- Ms. Donna Marie Douglas
- Mr. Kenneth George Phillips
- Ms. Donna Pink Smith

=== From Her Majesty The Queen in Right of the United Kingdom ===
==== Most Excellent Order of the British Empire ====
===== Officer of the Most Excellent Order of the British Empire =====
- Mr. Tony Sau-wo Yu
- Ms. Emer Timmons

===== Member of the Most Excellent Order of the British Empire =====
- Ms. Gabrielle Naomi Eirew
- Mr. Jamil Malik
- Mr. Alan Marwood
- Mr. Erdem Moralioglu

==== British Empire Medal ====
- Ms. Nancy Southern
- Ms. Linda Southern-Heathcott

==== Operational Service Medal for Iraq and Syria with Clasp ====
- Captain Lex Luciak

=== From the President of Austria ===
==== Grand Decoration of Honour for Services to the Republic of Austria ====
- Mr. Roland Pirker
- Mr. Kurt Yakov Tutter

==== Austrian Cross of Honour for Science and Art, 1st Class ====
- Mr. Joseph Patrouch

==== Gold Medal for Services to the Republic of Austria ====
- Mr. Hugh Campbell
- Mrs. Robin Campbell

=== From His Majesty The King of the Belgians ===
==== Golden Palms of the Order of the Crown ====
- Ms. Jacqueline Lyanga

==== Labour Decoration, Second Class ====
- Ms. Rosa Dicembre

=== From the President of the Federative Republic of Brazil ===
==== Tamandaré Medal of Merit ====
- Captain(N) Réal Brisson

=== From Her Majesty The Queen of Denmark ===
==== Knight of the Royal Order of the Dannebrog ====
- Mr. Robert Seidel
- Ms. Helle Wilson

=== From the President of the Republic of Finland ===
==== First Class Medal of the Order of the White Rose of Finland, with gold cross ====
- Ms. Eija Swenson

==== Order of the Lion of Finland ====
===== Commander =====
- The Honourable Eugene P. Rossiter

===== Knight =====
- Ms. Laura McSwiggan

=== From the President of the French Republic ===
==== National Order of the Legion of Honour ====
===== Commander of the National Order of the Legion of Honour =====
- The Honourable Serge Joyal, P.C.

===== Knight of the National Order of the Legion of Honour =====
- Dr. Mona Nemer, C.M., C.Q.

==== Military Medal ====
- Mr. André Louis Marie Oliviero

==== National Order of Merit ====
===== Officer of the National Order of Merit =====
- Josette Villavarayan Bardon

===== Knight of the National Order of Merit =====
- Anita Mathilde Dell
- Catherine Mounier
- Franck Point
- Danielle Weiler-Thaler

==== Order of the Academic Palms ====
===== Commander of the Order of the Academic Palms =====
- Jean-Jacques Van Vlasselaer

===== Officer of the Order of the Academic Palms =====
- Mr. Maurice Basque

===== Knight of the Order of the Academic Palms =====
- Ms. Sophie Beaulé
- Dr. Claire Boudreau
- Ms. Monique Bournot-Trites
- Ms. Lace Marie Brogden
- Ms. Leila Marie Farah
- Mr. Feridun Hamdullahpur
- Mr. André Lamontagne
- Ms. Hélène Lefebvre
- Ms. Judith Plessis
- Mr. Chabane Bouaziz
- Ms. Magda Fusaro
- Ms. Zoubia Hadjadj
- Mr. Célestin Mbanianga
- Ms. Danièle Moore
- Ms. Nazanin Shahdi
- Mr. Richard Smith

==== Officer of the Order of Agricultural Merit ====
- Mr. Michel Jacob

==== Order of Arts and Letters ====
===== Commander of the Order of Arts and Letters =====
- Mr. Donald Sutherland

===== Officer of the Order of Arts and Letters =====
- Mr. Pierre Auger
- Ms. Marie Chouinard
- Ms. Monique Cormier
- Ms. Jeannette Lajeunesse Zingg
- Mr. Pierre Lapointe
- Mr. Marshall Pynkoski
- Mr. Serge Quérin
- Mr. Robert Vézina
- Mr. Normand Charbonneau

====== Knight of the Order of Arts and Letters ======
- Ms. Myriam Achard
- Mr. Christopher Butcher
- Ms. Suzanne Cyr
- Mr. Stan Douglas
- Ms. Karena Lam
- Mr. René Légère
- Ms. Ariane Moffatt
- Ms. Susan Point
- Mr. Denis Villeneuve

==== National Defence Medal, Bronze Echelon ====
- Captain Brendan Alexander
- Lieutenant-Colonel John Benson
- Warrant Officer Louis Thivierge
- Chief Warrant Officer Joseph Martin Colbert
- Chief Superintendent Maureen Levy
- Lieutenant-Colonel Alexandre Dubois

==== Foreign Affairs Medal of Honour, Bronze Echelon ====
- Mr. Philippe Pouet

=== From the President of the Federal Republic of Germany ===
==== Order of Merit of the Federal Republic of Germany ====
===== Knight Commander's Cross of the Order of Merit of the Federal Republic of Germany =====
- The Honourable Rosalie Silberman Abella

===== Officer's Cross of the Order of Merit of the Federal Republic of Germany =====
- Mr. Sibrandes Poppema

===== Cross of the Order of Merit of the Federal Republic of Germany =====
- Ms. Alexandra Scheibler

=== From the President of Hungary ===
==== Officer's Cross of the Order of Merit of Hungary (Civil Division) ====
- Mr. Frank Füredi

==== Knight's Cross of the Order of Merit of Hungary ====
- Mr. Arthur M. Szabo

==== Gold Cross of Merit of Hungary ====
- Mr. Sándor Balla
- Mr. István Savanya

==== Silver Cross of Merit of Hungary ====
- Ms. Éva Alexandrovici Bottyán
- Ms. Mária Herédi
- Mr. Tibor Kocsis

=== From the President of the Italian Republic ===
==== Knight of the Order of the Star of Italy ====
- Mr. Mario Di Tommaso

=== From His Majesty The Emperor of Japan ===
==== Order of the Rising Sun ====
===== Gold Rays with Neck Ribbon =====
- Mr. Réal Tanguay

===== Gold Rays with Rosette =====
- Mr. Jean Dorion
- Mr. William James Lee

===== Gold and Silver Star =====
- The Honourable Perrin Beatty

===== Gold and Silver Rays =====
- Ms. Atsuko Bersma
- Mr. James Hutchings Taylor
- Mr. David Wesley Morrison
- Ms. Sanae Ohki
- Ms. Marie Meiko Ikeda
- Ms. Kumiko Lucy Yamashita

===== Silver Rays =====
- Mr. Hiroshi Nakamura
- Mr. Peter Hiroshi Wakayama

=== From the President of the Republic of Korea ===
==== Order of Military Merit of the Republic of Korea ====
- Sergeant Delphis Cormier (retired)

==== Order of Civil Merit of the Republic of Korea ====
- Mr. Guy Black

=== From the President of Latvia ===
==== Order of the Three Stars, Fourth Class ====
- Mr. George Kenins
- Mr. Atis Otto Bredovskis
- Mr. Alberts Vitols

==== Cross of Recognition, Fourth Class ====
- Ms. Laura Adlers
- Ms. Brigita Alks

=== From the President of the Republic of Moldova ===
==== Medal for Cooperation ====
- Colonel Alexander Schwab

=== From the Secretary General of the North Atlantic Treaty Organization ===
==== NATO Meritorious Service Medal ====
- Lieutenant-Colonel Colin Richardson
- Colonel Alexander Schwab
- Major-General Dany Fortin
- Major Gillian Parker

=== From His Majesty The King of Norway ===
==== Knight, 1st class of the Royal Norwegian Order of Merit ====
- Mr. Robert Jette
- Ms. Heather Quale

=== From the Government of the Republic of Poland ===
==== Order of the White Eagle ====
- Mr. Lucjan Krolikowski (posthumous)

==== Officer's Cross of the Order of Merit of the Republic of Poland ====
- Mr. Juliusz Kirejczyk

==== Knight's Cross of the Order of Merit of the Republic of Poland ====
- Mr. Kazimierz Chrapka

==== Order of Polonia Restituta ====
===== Officer's Cross of the Order of Polonia Restituta =====
- Mr. Stefan Podsiadlo

===== Knight's Cross of the Order of Polonia Restituta =====
- Mr. Adam Roman Leuchter

==== Gold Cross of Merit ====
- Ms. Grazyna Galezowska
- Mr. Jerzy Kowalczyk
- Ms. Anna Barycka

==== Silver Cross of Merit ====
- Ms. Lidia Dabrowska
- Ms. Katarzyna Szubert
- Mr. Alfred Zawadzki
- Ms. Maria Zlobicka
- Ms. Anna Czyzo

==== Bronze Cross of Merit ====
- Ms. Bozena Szubert

==== Cross with Swords of the Order of the Cross of Independence ====
- Mr. Stanislaw Jan Hardy (posthumous)

==== Cross of Freedom and Solidarity ====
- Mr. Ryszard Kusmierczyk
- Mr. Mieczyslaw Partyka
- Ms. Barbara Anna Stewart
- Mr. Jan Toporowski
- Mr. Zbigniew Roman Wiewior
- Mr. Antoni Pawel Kaminski
- Mr. Zbigniew Labedzki (posthumous)

==== Siberian Exiles Cross ====
- Mr. Lucjan Krolikowski (posthumous)
- Mr. Jerry Andrew Proskurnicki
- Mr. Boleslaw Gumulka
- Mr. Augustyn Noga (posthumous)

==== Long Marital Life Medal ====
- Mrs. Iwonna Buczkowska
- Mr. Piotr Buczkowski
- Mrs. Zdzislawa Kazimiera Dziewierz
- Mr. Zdzislaw Piotr Dziewierz
- Mrs. Barbara Genowefa Kusilo
- Mr. Andrzej Grzegorz Kusilo
- Mrs. Irena Urbanowicz
- Mr. Jan Jozef Urbanowicz

=== From the President of the Russian Federation ===
==== Order of Friendship of the Russian Federation ====
- Mr. Philip Esposito

=== From the President of the United States of America ===
==== Legion of Merit ====
===== Commander of the Legion of Merit =====
- Vice-Admiral Maurice F. R. Lloyd
- Lieutenant-General Michael J. Hood

===== Officer of the Legion of Merit, First Oak Leaf Cluster =====
- Lieutenant-General Wayne D. Eyre

===== Officer of the Legion of Merit =====
- Brigadier-General Patrice J. R. Laroche
- Brigadier-General Conrad Mialkowski
- Brigadier-General François J. Chagnon
- Brigadier-General Marc R. Gagné
- Major-General Simon Hetherington
- Brigadier-General Michel-Henri St-Louis

===== Legionnaire of the Legion of Merit =====
- Colonel Darron P. Bazin
- Colonel Christian Ouellette

==== Bronze Star Medal ====
- Colonel Jean-François Cauden

==== Defence Meritorious Service Medal ====
- Lieutenant-Colonel Annie Bergeron
- Major Jeffery G. Brownridge
- Lieutenant-Colonel Alain J. Dallaire
- Lieutenant-Colonel Andrew J. Duncan
- Major Gerhard N. Hildebrandt
- Master Warrant Officer Rodney A. Hutchinson
- Captain(N) Shawn P. Osborne
- Commander Samuel E. Patchell
- Major Rodney M. Redden
- Colonel Alexander T. Ruff
- Captain Paul P. Simmons
- Brigadier-General Nicolas D. Stanton
- Major Gregory P. Vander Kloet
- Lieutenant-Colonel Jason E. King
- Major Joseph Roland Stéphane Larrivée
- Major Francis J. C. P. Lavoie
- Major Dominic Adams-Robenhymer
- Inspector Robert Fulks
- Colonel Dominic Goulet
- Commander Lawrence Moraal
- Lieutenant-Commander Justin Raymond
- Lieutenant-Colonel Klaus Schneider
- Superintendent Andris Zarins

==== Meritorious Service Medal ====
- Lieutenant-Commander Brennan B. Blanchfield
- Major Scott S. Leblanc
- Major Marcelo Plada
- Colonel Jean-François Cauden
- Major Sheri R. Lattemore
- Warrant Officer Paul E. Messier
- Lieutenant-Colonel Joseph R. Oldford
- Lieutenant-Colonel Wilfred P. Rellinger
- Major Timothy R. Van Mourik
- Lieutenant-Colonel J. C. Martin Arcand
- Chief Warrant Officer Andrew Rusconi

==== Air Medal, First Oak Leaf Cluster ====
- Captain Byron R. Dennis
- Warrant Officer Kimberly L. Fournier
- Master Corporal Teal Smith

==== Air Medal ====
- Major Michael J. Gohier
- Sergeant Barry W. Myers
- Master Corporal Brandon M. Banfield
- Captain Angela M. Hudson
- Master Corporal Damien Hocquard
- Major Matthew Jokela
- Sergeant Remi Lavoie
- Captain Kevin Long
- Sergeant Matthew Mochoruk
- Major David Murphy
- Major Neil Ryan
- Master Corporal Teal Smith

== Erratums of Commonwealth and Foreign Orders, Decorations and Medal awarded to Canadians ==
=== Correction of 29 February 2020 ===
The notice published on page 4533 of the 28 December 2019, issue of the Canada Gazette, Part I, contained an error. Accordingly, the following modifications are made - Delete the following award: From the President of the French Republic, the National Defence Medal, Bronze Echelon to Major Francis Lavoie replace with the following: From the President of the French Republic the National Defence Medal, Bronze Echelon with "Armée de terre" clasp to Major Francis Lavoie.

== See also ==
- 2020 Australia Day Honours
- 2020 New Year Honours (New Zealand)
- 2020 British and Commonwealth honours
- 2020 United Kingdom's Birthday honours list
- 2020 Special Honours

== Sources ==
- CANFORGEN 177/19 CMP 092/19 111607Z 19 DEC
- CANFORGEN 177/19 CMP 092/19 111607Z DEC 19
