= Paul Joseph Cini =

Canadian airline hijacker (born c. 1944)

- Born: c. 1944
- Citizenship: Canadian
- Known for: First skyjacking utilizing a parachute for escape
- Status: Paroled (1982)
- Motive: Money, fame
- Conviction: April 1972
- Criminal charge: Hijacking of airliner
- Penalty: Sentenced to life imprisonment

Details
- Victims: Passengers and crew of Air Canada Flight 812
- Date: 12 November 1971
- Locations: Canada; United States
- Weapons: Shotgun; dynamite

Paul Joseph Cini (born c. 1944) is a Canadian plane hijacker who was the first person to perform a skyjacking with a planned escape by use of a parachute. In November 1971 Cini boarded Air Canada Flight 812, and—posing as an international terrorist—proceeded to hijack the plane. During the next eight hours, the plane made several mid-air diversions from its original flight plan that included a stop in the United States in order to pick up ransom money. Cini, who often became agitated during the event, was kept calm by a flight attendant, Mary Dohey, who had a psychological background before working for the airline. The hijacker was overpowered by Dohey and two additional members of the flight crew when he attempted to bail from the plane over the Alberta, Canada, wilderness.

== Background ==
While watching a news story about an unsuccessful hijacking, 27-year-old Calgary truck driver, Paul Cini, developed the idea of commandeering an airliner that featured a novel approach to escaping justice: he planned to evade capture by parachuting into the Canadian wilderness instead of landing by the plane. Although he was deathly afraid of heights, Cini later stated that he thought that receiving a ransom and escaping into the wilderness was his one chance to escape what he considered to be a lacklustre life with low prospects. He picked Air Canada Flight 812 that was utilizing an Air Canada DC-8, on a regularly scheduled flight from Vancouver to Toronto via one stop at Calgary, as his target.

== The hijacking ==
On 12 November 1971, Cini boarded the airliner at its scheduled first stop in Calgary, Alberta, Canada. He had prepared for his actions by bringing several items with him in his luggage. His equipment included: a sawed-off shotgun, two bundles of dynamite, rope, a black hood, a makeshift parachute wrapped with cord, and camping equipment for survival in the wilderness following his planned exit from the plane.

After consuming several alcoholic drinks, Cini, posing as an Irish Republican Army (IRA) terrorist seeking refuge and safe passage to Northern Ireland, retrieved several weapons from his luggage, donned his black hood, and proceeded to hijack the plane. With the use of a shotgun and a bag filled with dynamite, Cini convinced Flight Attendant Mary Dohey of his intentions. Dohey, who had trained as a psychiatric nurse before becoming a flight attendant, managed to calm the often highly-agitated Cini during the eight-hour ordeal, even though she was forced by Cini to maintain pressure on the bomb trigger that kept two hot electrical wires apart during the entirety of the event.

"I wanted recognition ... I wanted to stand up and say, 'Hey, I’m Paul Cini, and I’m here, and I exist, and I want to be noticed.' " —Paul Cini

Dohey brought the hijacker's demands to Flight Captain Vernon Ehman, who directed the aircraft, carrying 114 passengers and nine crew, to alter its course to Great Falls, Montana where Cini demanded CD$1.5 million as ransom be delivered. Unable to produce that amount of currency quickly, Air Canada gave him a package containing US$50,000, which he accepted, possibly unaware of the shortfall. Cini allowed the release of all the passengers, and most of the crew at Great Falls, before moving forward with his plan. Dohey, however, voluntarily remained onboard due to the calming effect she had on Cini.

Cini ordered the plane to continue on to Phoenix, Arizona, but once in the air, the inebriated skyjacker quickly changed his mind and demanded the plane head back into Canada. Nearing Calgary, Cini put his escape plan into motion, readying the plane to allow his departure by parachute into the Alberta "wilderness", although they were over a rurally populated range and farmland at the time. The parachute, however, could not be deployed due to his inability to untie the knot in the twine he had used to secure it. Demanding something to cut through the bindings, a member of the flight crew, John Joseph Arpin, brought him a fire axe. When Cini absent mindedly put the shotgun down to use the axe, Pilot-in-Command Ehman jumped him and Assistant Purser Philippe Bonny hit him in the head with the axe handle, which fractured his skull and rendered him unconscious. This act brought the hijacking to a swift close.

== Aftermath ==
Cini was eventually arraigned on seven charges, four of which carried a maximum penalty of life imprisonment. In April 1972, Cini was convicted of all charges and sentenced to life imprisonment. He was, however, paroled after 10 years (in 1982). In December 1975, for actions taken during the flight, Flight Attendant Dohey was awarded the Cross of Valour for bravery; (Note: Dohey was the first living person, and to that date only the third overall, to receive the Canadian Cross of Valour, the country's highest award for bravery.) Flight Purser Arpin received the Canadian Star of Courage; Captain Ehman and Assistant Purser Bonny both received the Medal of Bravery No other injuries were reported from the event—other than Cini's cracked skull—even though he had at one time accidentally discharged his shotgun during the hijacking.

== Legacy ==
This hijacking was followed just 11 days later with the skyjacking of Northwest Orient Airlines Flight 305, an event that featured what appeared to be another hijacker's successful escape by parachuting out from the plane into the Northwestern United States wilderness. This hijacker was known only by the pseudonym D. B. Cooper.

== See also ==
- List of aircraft hijackings
- Canadian Air Transport Security Authority
