= Lester Robert Fudge =

Canadian Cross of Valour recipient

Lester Robert Fudge CV of Burin, Newfoundland and Labrador, was awarded the Cross of Valour, Canada's highest decoration for civilian bravery on April 6, 1981. Mr. Fudge was involved in the rescue of twelve crewmen trapped aboard a Danish trawler caught in strong seas.

Harold Miller and Martin Sceviour, also involved in the rescue, were similarly awarded the Cross. Government House stated this was the first time the Cross had been awarded to three people simultaneously.

== Citation ==
The official citation reads:

At the risk of perishing, Lester Fudge, along with Harold Miller and Martin Sceviour saved the lives of twelve crewmen trapped aboard the Danish trawler Remoy which was caught in strong seas and listing precariously some 13 kilometres out of Nain, Labrador, on 19 November 1978. Late at night, her call of distress was received in Nain and the fishing vessel Zermatt set out in the very worst of weather conditions, her progress hindered by winds of 100 kilometres per hour and freezing spray. She sailed as close as possible to the Remoy which had run aground on a sand reef, had lost her power, was heavily iced over and in imminent danger of capsizing. Messrs. Fudge, Miller and Sceviour volunteered to man a six-metre motor boat and attempt to rescue the stranded crewmen. The cold was so severe that no one could have survived even one minute if they had fallen into the sea. Progress was slow as the three men had to bail out water that the high winds and one and half metre waves pushed into their small craft. They succeeded in transferring seven men to the Zermatt and valiantly made their way a second time through slob ice and raging sea, and succeeded in getting the remaining crewmen to safety aboard the Zermatt.

== See also ==
- Canadian Bravery Decorations
