= Mary Dohey =

Canadian flight attendant (1933-2017)

Mary Dohey CV
- Born: September 22, 1933; St. Bride's, Dominion of Newfoundland
- Died: June 12, 2017 (aged 83)
- Known for: Negotiating the safe release of passengers and crew during the hijacking of a commercial DC-8 aircraft in 1971.

Mary Dohey, CV (22 September 1933 – 12 June 2017) was a Canadian airline flight attendant who was the first living person to receive the award of the Cross of Valour, Canada's highest award for bravery, for her conduct during the hijacking of an Air Canada DC-8 aircraft in 1971.

Dohey was the third recipient of the Cross of Valour and the first to receive the prize herself, as two previous awards were both posthumous. In December 1975 she was awarded the Cross of Valour for bravery; John Joseph Arpin, the purser, received the Star of Courage and the aircraft Captain Vernon Ehman the Medal of Bravery.

== Hijacking incident ==
At the risk of losing her life, Dohey declined an offer of safe release from the aircraft, to remain with her fellow crew members and pacify hijacker Paul Cini, on flight 812 from Calgary, Alberta on November 12, 1971. During eight hours of terror, the hijacker, with a black hood over his head, was armed with a shotgun and two bundles of dynamite. Dohey had to hold onto the wires of the dynamite and not let them touch. The hijacker threatened to take the lives of the crew and all the passengers on board the airplane. Although continually threatened with the gun, Dohey continuing speaking with the aggressor and succeeded in discouraging him from undertaking violent measures which would have killed many people. When the aircraft was diverted and landed in Great Falls, Montana, she was able to persuade the hijacker to allow all the passengers and part of the crew, including herself, to disembark. With absolutely no assurance that she would come out of the ordeal alive and because of her concern for the welfare of the remaining crew members, Mary Dohey turned down the offer of release. The hijacker demanded $1.5 million CA$1.5 million (equivalent to $11.8 million in 2025) in exchange for his hostages; when the plane landed, he was given a briefcase with only $50,000 (equivalent to $393,000 in 2025), which was unknown to the hijacker. Dohey continued to appease the hijacker until the drama was brought to an end.

Dohey had graduated years earlier as a psychiatric nurse, and that training and experience proved invaluable. Because of the courage she displayed during the hijacking, Dohey was awarded the Cross of Valour in December 1975. Dohey was considered to have saved the lives of over 200 passengers and crew members. After the hijacking, she continued her career as a flight attendant, finally retiring in 1991, even though she suffered nightmares and fears.

== Personal life ==
From a large family in St. Bride's, Newfoundland, Dohey had many relatives spread out throughout Canada and spent a number of summers during her time off with her brother Harry and his family in Holyrood. She had been a resident of Mississauga, Ontario since 1967.

Dohey died at the age of 83 on June 12, 2017. There is a merit award named in her honour, administered by the Friends of Cape St. Mary.
