= Jean Swedberg =

Canadian Cross of Valour recipient

Jean Swedberg CV of Merritt, British Columbia, was posthumously awarded the Cross of Valour, Canada's highest decoration for civilian bravery on May 17, 1976. Mrs. Swedberg lost her life while trying to alert guests that a fire had broken out in the hotel she worked at in Merritt, British Columbia.

== Citation ==
The official citation reads:

"On 4 September 1974, with complete disregard for her own safety, Jean Swedberg, switchboard operator at the Valnicola Hotel in Merritt, British Columbia, left her post to alert the guests during a fire which razed the building and which claimed her own life. The fire began on the ground floor of the frame structure and quickly spread out of control. Racing through the heat and smoke, Mrs. Swedberg spread the alarm to the occupants of the dining room and then proceeded up the stairs to the second storey. By then the smoke had filled the corridor and created havoc amongst the guests. Though fully aware of the holocaust around her, Mrs. Swedberg went from door to door to ensure that everyone had been warned, and it was when reaching the last few rooms that fire shot up the stairwell, completely sealing off all means of escape. Within minutes the hotel was a mass of flames and there was no hope of saving the rescuer. Faced with the most perilous conditions, Mrs. Swedberg displayed the finest example of selfless courage and was instrumental in the rescue of all but one of the guests."

== See also ==
- Cross of Valour
- Canadian Bravery Decorations
