= David Gordon Cheverie =

Canadian Cross of Valour recipient (born 1956)

David Gordon Cheverie CV, SC (born 1956) is a Canadian recipient of the Cross of Valour, the highest Canadian award for bravery. It is the highest honour available for Canadian civilians. He demonstrated unwavering courage of the highest order by repeatedly risking his life to save three children from a house fire on the night of May 16, 1987, while a member of the Charlottetown Police Department. The award was presented on August 19, 1988.

Prior to receiving the Cross of Valour, on March 6, 1987, he was awarded the Star of Courage for a separate act. It is the second highest Canadian civilian award for bravery.

== Cross of Valour citation ==
Cross of Valour

Reacting instantly after he and his patrol partner saw flames through the living-room window of a house, Cst. Cheverie forced open the door and crawled on his hands and knees into the fiercely burning living-room to see if anyone was there. While his partner coaxed one little boy to jump from an upstairs window, Cst. Cheverie braved flames, heavy smoke and heat so intense it scorched his leather jacket and singed his hair and eyebrows to enter the house and search through the pitch-black and smoke-filled bedrooms for other victims.

Finding a little girl unconscious on the floor, he picked her up, ran downstairs and handed her to another officer who had tried to enter the building but had been driven back by the heat. He immediately ran back upstairs and found an older girl, whom he threw over his shoulder while continuing his search. Stumbling over the body of a fourth child in the darkness, he grabbed her under his other arm and, certain he had found everyone, headed for the stairs. By now the fire had completely engulfed the front hallway of the house and was advancing up the stairwell. Still carrying the two girls, Cst. Cheverie raced through the tunnel of flames and out the front door.

Within seconds, a large fireball shot out through the door behind them and moments later, the entire structure was ablaze.

== Star of Courage citation ==
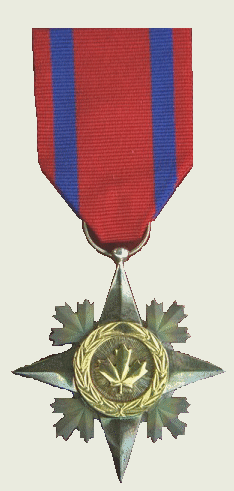
Star of Courage

Early on the morning of March 10, 1986, Cst. David Cheverie, of the Charlottetown Police Department, rescued a man from a house fire in Charlottetown, Prince Edward Island. To do so, he had to enter the downstairs apartment of the house four times because the smoke and heat were such that he could not breathe. He had had no training in fire rescue and was aware that highly explosive oxygen tanks were in the apartment. Nevertheless, he entered voluntarily, crawling on his stomach into the heart of the main fire. Cst. Cheverie was hampered by extremely poor visibility and heat so intense that paper on the floor ignited spontaneously. His own clothes caught fire. However, persevering, he located the man and carried him to safety. Once outside, Cst. Cheverie gave artificial respiration to the man, who was then taken to hospital for treatment.
