= François Emeric Gaston Langelier =

Canadian prison officer

François Emeric Gaston Langelier CV of Saint-Cuthbert, Quebec, was awarded the Cross of Valour, Canada's highest civilian decoration for bravery on April 2, 1979, for his actions in helping subdue a prisoner at a maximum penitentiary during an altercation that resulted in the death of a coworker.

== Citation ==
The official citation reads:

On 11 July 1978, Gaston Langelier, Guy Fournier and Marc Drouin set an example of selfless courage in protecting other staff members in the Laval Institution in Montreal whose lives were threatened by five armed prisoners in this maximum security penitentiary. As Mr. Langelier, then assistant director of security at the Institution and several members of the staff were being forced down a flight of stairs, he disarmed one of the inmates. In the scuffle that followed, Guy Fournier and Marc Drouin rushed forward to help the assistant director. Both were subsequently shot at point-blank range by another inmate who had retrieved the weapon. Mr. Fournier died instantly and Mr. Drouin was severely wounded. At the cost of being shot himself, Mr. Langelier tried again to disarm his captor. He was wounded three times but persisted until the gunman was overcome.

== See also ==
- Canadian Bravery Decorations
