= Anna Lang =

Anna Lang may refer to:

- Anna Lang (harpist) (1874–1920), Swedish harpist
- Anna Ruth Lang, recipient of the Canadian Cross of Valour
