= Thomas Hynes (Cross of Valour recipient) =

Canadian Cross of Valour recipient (died 1977)

Thomas Hynes CV of Fortune Bay, Newfoundland and Labrador, was posthumously awarded Canada's highest decoration for civilian bravery on September 11, 1978. Mr Hynes died while trying to save his eight-year old cousin from drowning on a frozen pond.

== Citation ==
The official citation reads:

"On 29 December 1977, Thomas Hynes, aged nineteen, gave his life while saving his eight-year-old cousin, from drowning. The child and another boy had run out on a frozen pond and fallen through the ice. The other lad pulled himself out from fifteen feet of water, but Thomas' cousin was floundering and made no headway. When Thomas saw this, he entered the water with no regard for his own safety and kept pushing the boy onto the ice. The victim was thus able to reach for a stick extended to him by another youth and was pulled to safety. Thomas by this time was exhausted from supporting his cousin, and though he struggled to stay afloat, he slipped under and was drowned."

== See also ==
Cross of Valour

Canadian Bravery Decorations
