= Star of Courage =

The Star of Courage may refer to the following decorations:

- The Star of Courage (Australia), the second-highest civil award of Australia
- The Star of Courage (Canada), the second-highest civil award of Canada
