= Anna Ruth Lang =

Canadian Cross of Valour recipient (1940–2024)

Lang was awarded the Cross of Valour, Canada's highest honour for bravery, in 1982.

Anna Ruth Lang CV (6 September 1940 - 16 May 2024) was a recipient of the Canadian Cross of Valour.

On 9 September 1980, Lang rescued two car passengers, Lana Walsh and her four-year-old son, Jaye. At the entry of the Hammond River bridge a gasoline truck hit Lang's car from behind and rammed it off the bridge and into the river. At that point the tanker fell into the river and exploded. The water was burning hot and their car sank quickly. Lana swam to shore in her heavy clothes while holding her son. Suffering a concussion and under threat of spreading fire, Lang swam to shore and removed her heavy clothing, then returned to Lana and her son and dragged them to a safe distance from the fire and to shore. She suffered extreme burns during the rescue.

She was awarded the Cross of Valour, the highest ranking of the Canadian Bravery Decorations, one of only 20 who have received the award since the award was established in 1972.

Two others who aided in the rescue from the shore, Jackie Chaisson and Erik Sparks, were awarded the Star of Courage, Canada's second-highest award for bravery.

She died on May 16, 2024, at the Saint John Regional Hospital.

== See also ==
- Canadian Bravery Decorations
