= Harold Gilbert Miller =

Canadian awarded the Cross of Valour

Harold Gilbert Miller CV MB of Trinity Bay, Newfoundland and Labrador, was awarded the Cross of Valour, Canada's highest civilian decoration for bravery on April 6, 1981, for his actions involving the rescue of 12 crewman aboard a Danish trawler in rough seas. Mr. Miller was also awarded a Medal of Bravery, Canada's third highest decoration for civilian bravery in a separate incident on June 26, 1989 for the water rescue of a crewman who was about to drown after falling overboard while at sea.

== Citation (Cross of Valour) ==
The official citation reads:

At the risk of perishing, Lester Fudge, along with Harold Miller and Martin Sceviour saved the lives of twelve crewmen trapped aboard the Danish trawler Remoy which was caught in strong seas and listing precariously some 13 kilometres out of Nain, Labrador, on 19 November 1978. Late at night, her call of distress was received in Nain and the fishing vessel Zermatt set out in the very worst of weather conditions, her progress hindered by winds of 100 kilometres per hour and freezing spray. She sailed as close as possible to the Remoy which had run aground on a sand reef, had lost her power, was heavily iced over and in imminent danger of capsizing. Messrs. Fudge, Miller and Sceviour volunteered to man a six-metre motor boat and attempt to rescue the stranded crewmen. The cold was so severe that no one could have survived even one minute if they had fallen into the sea. Progress was slow as the three men had to bail out water that the high winds and one and half metre waves pushed into their small craft. They succeeded in transferring seven men to the Zermatt and valiantly made their way a second time through slob ice and raging sea, and succeeded in getting the remaining crewmen to safety aboard the Zermatt.

== Citation (Medal of Bravery) ==
The official citation reads:

On December 6, 1987, a crewman aboard the Newfoundland-based trawler Atlantic Elizabeth went overboard. A life ring with a line was thrown to the man, who was wearing a floater vest, but he drifted out of sight in the darkness. The vessel came about, located him with searchlights and the crew threw him another life ring which he was able to grasp. Aware that the man was losing consciousness in the cold water, Mr. Harold Miller went to his aid. He reached the now-unconscious man and, holding his head above water in the heavy seas, brought him alongside the vessel.

== See also ==
- Cross of Valour
- Medal of Bravery
- Canadian Bravery Decorations
