= John Wendell MacLean =

Canadian Cross of Valour recipient

John Wendell MacLean CV from Inverness, Nova Scotia, was posthumously awarded the Cross of Valour, Canada's highest civilian decoration for bravery on October 30, 1992 after saving his wife, son and grandson from a burning house trailer in Inverness County, Nova Scotia.

== Citation ==
The official citation reads:

Mr. MacLean lost his life following attempts to rescue family members from a burning house trailer in Inverness County, Nova Scotia, early on the morning of March 14, 1992. Alerted to the fire, he rushed outside with his wife and son, then re-entered as soon as he realized his daughter and three-year-old grandson were still inside. Although the ceiling was already crumbling, he passed through the heart of the blaze to rescue his grandson. Mr. MacLean twice attempted to return for his daughter, but the intensity of the fire forced him to retreat. A further attempt to enter through a window also failed. The daughter perished in the fire and Mr. MacLean succumbed to his burns a few days later.

== See also ==
- Cross of Valour
- Canadian Bravery Decorations
