= Cross of Valour (Canada) =

Courage award in Canada

- Badge of the Cross of Valour
- Type: State decoration
- Awarded for: Acts of the most conspicuous courage in circumstances of extreme peril
- Presented by: The governor general of Canada
- Post-nominals: CV
- Status: Currently awarded
- Established: 1 May 1972
- First award: 20 July 1972
- Final award: 24 October 2024
- Created by: Elizabeth II

Highlights
- Total: 21
- Total awarded posthumously: 6
- Ribbon bar of the Cross of Valour

Precedence
- Next (higher): Victoria Cross
- Next (lower): Order of Merit

The Cross of Valour (French: Croix de la vaillance) is a decoration that is, within the Canadian system of honours, the second-highest award (surpassed only by the Victoria Cross), the highest honour available for Canadian civilians, and the highest of the three Canadian Bravery Decorations. Created in 1972, it is presented to individuals, both Canadian and foreign, living and deceased, who have performed acts of the most conspicuous courage in circumstances of extreme peril. Recipients are allowed to use the post-nominal letters CV.

== History ==
The Cross of Valour was conceived of as a replacement for the Order of Canada's Medal of Courage, which had never been awarded since its creation in 1967. On the advice of her Cabinet headed by Prime Minister Pierre Trudeau, the Cross of Valour was initiated on 1 May 1972 by Queen Elizabeth II, and presented for the first time on 20 July of the same year. Prior to 1967, the equivalent medal that Canadians received was the George Cross, of which ten were awarded in Canada: eight military, one merchant navy, and one civilian.

The Cross of Valour became the centre of a controversy in 2007, when it was announced from the Chancellery of Honours at the Governor General of Canada's residence, Rideau Hall, that deceased Cobourg, Ontario, police constable Chris Garrett would not be awarded the honour. Garett died on duty after an individual lured him with a false 9-1-1 call and then cut his throat; however, Garett, as he was dying, shot and disabled the assailant, thereby preventing other planned attacks. But, because Garett's nominator waited until the trial for the constable's murderer was concluded, the application arrived at Rideau Hall eight months past the stipulated two-year deadline. After a public outcry, the Governor General-in-Council adjusted the rules of application for the Cross of Valour. Garrett was granted the Star of Courage.

== Design ==
The medal is a cross of four equal limbs rendered in gold, with the obverse enameled in red and edged with gold, and bearing at the centre a gold maple leaf surrounded by a gold laurel wreath. On the reverse is the Royal Cypher of the reigning Canadian sovereign and a crown above, on the upper arm, while the words VALOUR • VAILLANCE are etched below, extending along the upper edge of the two lateral arms of the cross. The recipient's name and the date of the incident for which they are being honoured are engraved underneath the motto. This medallion is worn by men, suspended from a red ribbon around the neck; and by women, below the left shoulder suspended from a red ribbon fashioned into a bow; a miniature cross may be worn on the ribbon bar in undress. Individuals who are awarded the Cross of Valour as second or subsequent time are granted a gold maple leaf to be carried on the same ring from which the original cross is hung; no bars have been issued to date.

== Eligibility ==
Anyone may nominate or be nominated for receipt of the Cross of Valour; the incident need not take place in Canada, but Canadian people and/or interests must be involved. The decoration may be awarded posthumously, though nominations must be made no later than two years following either the act of bravery itself or the conclusion of any coroner's or court's inquest into the events for which the person was nominated.

== Recipients ==
1. Vaino Olavi Partanen CV CD, posthumously awarded 20 July 1972
2. Lewis John Stringer CV CD, posthumously awarded 20 July 1972
3. Mary Dohey CV, awarded 1 December 1975
4. Kenneth Wilfrid Bishop CV, awarded 5 April 1976
5. Jean Swedberg CV, posthumously awarded 17 May 1976
6. Thomas Hynes CV, posthumously awarded 11 September 1978
7. François Emeric Gaston Langelier CV, awarded 2 April 1979
8. Amédéo Garrammone CV, awarded 28 January 1980
9. Lester Robert Fudge CV, awarded 6 April 1981
10. Harold Gilbert Miller CV MB, awarded 6 April 1981
11. Martin Sceviour CV, awarded 6 April 1981
12. Anna Ruth Lang CV, awarded 7 June 1982
13. Robert Gordon Teather CV CD, awarded 25 April 1983
14. René Marc Jalbert CV CD, awarded 16 July 1984 CV SC, awarded 13 June 1988
15. David Gordon Cheverie CV SC, awarded 13 June 1988
16. John Wendell MacLean CV, posthumously awarded 30 October 1992
17. Douglas Fader CV, awarded 16 June 1994
18. Keith Paul Mitchell CV MMM MSC CD, awarded 11 February 1998
19. Bryan Keith Pierce CV MMM MSC CD, awarded 11 February 1998
20. Leslie Arthur Palmer CV, awarded 4 May 2006. He represented recipients at the 2023 Coronation.
21. Patrick L'abbée Chouinard CV, posthumously awarded 24 October 2024

== See also ==
- Canadian order of precedence (decorations and medals)
- State decoration
