= Leslie Arthur Palmer =

Canadian awarded the Cross of Valour

First Officer Leslie Arthur Palmer CV of Prince Rupert, British Columbia was awarded the Cross of Valour, Canada's highest civilian decoration for bravery on May 4, 2006, for his efforts in rescuing two fishermen stranded on the shores of the Grenville Channel during a severe storm, near Prince Rupert, British Columbia.

== Citation ==
The official citation reads:

Late at night on December 27, 2004, First Officer Leslie Palmer, of the Canadian Coast Guard, braved a severe winter storm to rescue two fishermen stranded on the shores of the Grenville Channel, near Prince Rupert, British Columbia. Responding to the distress call, the Coast Guard vessel Point Henry arrived at destination in the worst of weather conditions and searched the shoreline for signs of victims. An hour later, spotting illumination flares set off by the vessel, the two survivors flashed a light in response to show their location. At the risk of perishing, First Officer Palmer got ashore using a small rubber boat but, hindered by the breaking surf on the beach and gusts of wind of up to a hundred knots, had to land half a kilometre from the survivors. Undeterred by the heavy shore spray freezing his eyelids shut and icing up the outer shell of his suit, he walked for an hour in hip-deep snow, struggling against sheer ice footing on a rocky shore, until he reached the two men huddled inside a life raft. Using a Kisby ring, the Point Henry crew transferred survival gear and medical equipment to the trio by carefully floating it to shore. First Officer Palmer valiantly made his way a second time to the beach, secured the equipment and returned to the barely responsive victims to administer first aid. He worked courageously to keep the two fishermen warm and alive as they waited on the beach for another four hours before medical help could reach them. By that time, they had lost all radio contact and had only a flashlight to use as a signal.

== See also ==
- Cross of Valour
- Canadian Bravery Decorations
