= Brett Cairns =

Canadian Air Force general

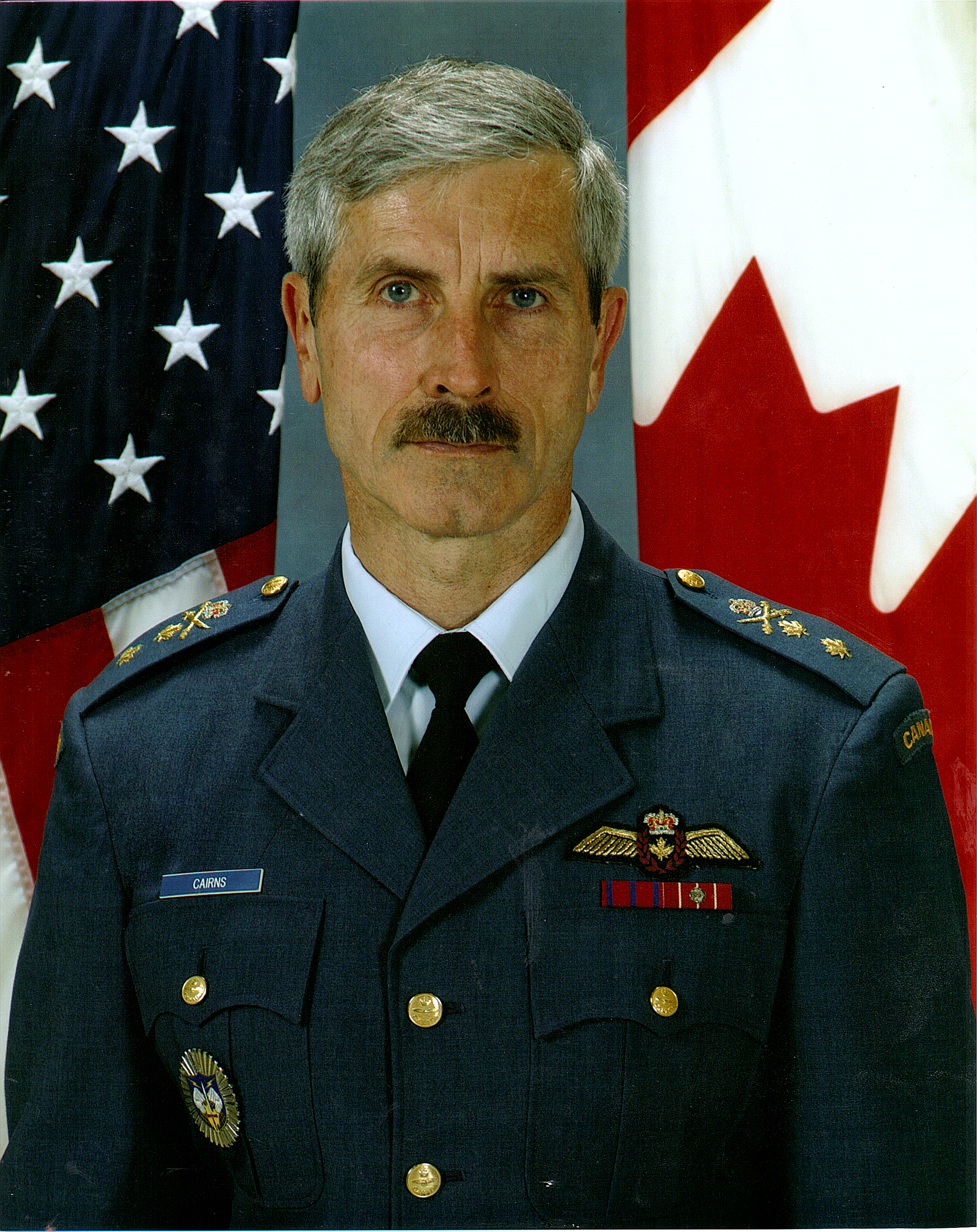
- Allegiance: Canada
- Branch: Canadian Forces
- Service years: 1973–2008
- Rank: Major general
- Commands: 416 Tactical Fighter Squadron; Deputy Commander, Alaskan NORAD Region
- Awards: Legion of Merit; Medal of Bravery (Canada); Canadian Forces' Decoration

Brett Cairns is a retired Canadian Air Force general who served Canada with distinction from 1973 to 2008. He also served with United States Armed Forces for 10 years of that 35-year period.

== Family and early life ==
Brett was a third generation military officer whose early life was heavily influenced by his father and grandfather. His grandfather earned his wings with the Royal Flying Corps during the First World War, and his father flew with the Royal Canadian Air Force during the Second World War.

His grandfather James Robertson Cairns joined the Canadian Air Force (1920-24) in 1920, and was the 47th person to join the Royal Canadian Air Force when it formed in 1924. His grandfather participated in an aerial survey operation conducted between July 18 and August 14, 1924, that was described in the 1924 Canadian Report on Aviation as "the greatest ever undertaken for aerial survey, and, when considered in light of the practical results, is one of the most brilliant achievements in the history of flying." The operation covered 15,000 square miles of area in northern Saskatchewan and Manitoba and he took over 1700 photographs from an altitude of 5,000 feet from a Vickers Viking. This aerial operation and the crew were featured on pages 188 to 190 of Aviation in Canada by Larry Milberry. The Government of Manitoba announced, on August 6, 1974, the designation of Cairns Lake in commemoration of his early aerial survey work.

His father Norman Douglas Cairns joined the RCAF in 1942 and flew the Supermarine Spitfire during the Second World War. He flew 30 different aircraft and logged 11,144 flying hours over the course of his career. He was also a test pilot and he tested the Northrop F-5 for Canada in 1965 at Edwards Air Force Base. Near the end of his career he established the Air Cadet Gliding Program at Mountain View, Ontario, in 1965. His father was the driving force behind, and did much of the early fundraising and planning for, the establishment of the RCAF museum which over time evolved into the National Air Force Museum of Canada located at Trenton Ontario.

Brett began his leadership development as a member of the Royal Canadian Air Cadets at the age of 11 and achieved the rank of Squadron Warrant Officer of his Air Cadet Squadron at the age of 16. He was awarded a one-month trip to the Netherlands in 1973 as part of an Air Cadet League of Canada Exchange program. In high school he played many sports, while also racing snowmobiles (won the World Series qualifier at the Peterborough Kawartha Cup in 1973) and Enduro go-karts (broke the track record at Mosport Park in 1974 which is now called Canadian Tire Motorsport Park), and building high performance automobiles. He graduated from high school as an Ontario Scholar in 1973.

== Military career ==
=== Cadet officer ===
Brett entered the Royal Military College of Canada in 1973. He spent four years there and he won awards for top all-around in academics, sports, and leadership. These all-around awards included: the Class of 42 Memorial Trophy in 1975; the Peter Fischer Memorial Trophy in 1976; and the Air Cadet League of Canada Award of Merit in 1977. He was awarded the Crossed Clubs award for athletic performance, the Cross Swords for leadership, and the Academic Star for academic performance. He was selected to be the captain of the High Box Display Team, the Cadet Wing Academic Officer, and he graduated with a Bachelor of Mechanical Engineering.

=== Junior officer ===
Brett completed the Basic Jet Pilot course (September 1978 to September 1978) at CFB Moose Jaw, and the Basic Fighter Pilot Course (October 1978 to April 1979) at CFB Cold Lake. While at 434 Tactical Fighter Squadron (Apr 1979 to February 1982) he completed the Canadian Forces Staff School, upgraded to section lead, and completed the Fighter Weapons Instructor Course (Canada's equivalent of the USAF Weapons School and the United States Navy Strike Fighter Tactics Instructor program).

While at the 16th Tactical Reconnaissance Squadron at Shaw Air Force Base, South Carolina (February 1982 to August 1984) he graduated as top student of the RF-4C Phantom II Conversion Course, was upgraded to Instructor Pilot, appointed to flight commander, and he was recognized by the Squadron Commander for outstanding leadership.

=== Senior officer ===
Brett was assigned to Fighter Group (Canada) Headquarters at CFB North Bay, Ontario from July 1984 to July 1985. He was promoted to major and assigned to the Directorate of Air Requirements at National Defence Headquarters (Canada) in Ottawa from 1985 to 1988.

On April 19, 1988, Brett rescued a fellow officer who had been overcome by one metre waves and a strong undertow while swimming at Fort Walton Beach, Florida. Seeing the man in distress, Cairns swam out to him and, battling the waves and current, brought him to rest on a sand bar. The weakened man was swept from the sand bar and Brett again retrieved him, bringing him to another sand bar where a life guard then took over the rescue. For this action, on 26 June 1989 Brett was awarded Canada's Medal for Bravery.

In the later part of 1988 he was promoted to lieutenant colonel and assigned to the Directing Staff of the one year Canadian Forces College in Toronto, Ontario. While there he authored 4 pamphlets entitled Canadian Military Aerospace Power in January 1999 for the benefit of the students. They discussed history, theorists and commanders, doctrine and joint doctrine. His work was later cited in official Air Force documents

Following graduation, he was assigned to the combined Fighter Group / Canadian NORAD Region Headquarters (1989 to 1991) as the senior staff officer, intelligence, plans and requirements. During the Gulf War he was appointed to the position of deputy chief of staff, intelligence, plans and requirements. Brett completed the CF5 Refresher Course and CF18 Conversion Course at CFB Cold Lake from 1991 to 1992 and was the top student on both courses. He was then appointed to be the commanding officer of 416 Tactical Fighter Squadron from 1992 to 1994 while flying the CF18 as a section lead and later as a mass attack lead.

Following this command position he completed the one-year French language course from 1994 to 1995. Brett was selected and appointed to be the director of air requirements at NDHQ from 1996 to 1999 where he wrote and published the Air Capital Equipment Framework dated 10 Feb 1999 that contained, among other things, a Canadian Requirement for the C-17 which Canada later purchased and took delivery of starting in 2007. Brett was selected to be the deputy commander of the Alaskan NORAD Region from 1999 to 2001, where he assisted his three-star American commander, Thomas Case, and subsequently, Norton A. Schwartz as they dealt with a resurgence of Russian long-range aviation approaching the shores of North America. While there, he authored an article entitled "Aerospace Power and Leadership Perspectives" that was featured in the Canadian Military Journal. He completed the United States Air Force Air War College in 2001 by correspondence.

Brett was assigned to NORAD Headquarters in Colorado Springs from 2001 to 2002 as the NORAD Vice Director of Policy, Plans, Programs and Requirements. He was the Senior Canadian planner on the NORAD Battle Staff in Cheyenne Mountain during the NORAD response to the catastrophic events of 9/11.

=== General officer ===
Brett was promoted to brigadier general in 2002 and appointed to NDHQ in Ottawa as the Director General Aerospace Development from 2002 to 2004. While in that position he created, wrote and had published a Vision (Strategic Vectors) and Guide (Security Above All) for the transformation of Canada's Air Force. As part of this work, he coordinated the production of a DVD (Canada's Air Force – Security Above All) for the Air Force. He also wrote and had published a long-term modernization plan (The Aerospace Capability Framework) for the Air Force. As well, he led Project Transform, an initiative to position the Air Force into the next decade and beyond. Project Transform included the establishment of a Canadian Forces Aerospace Warfare Centre in 2005.

Brett was appointed to the position of chief of staff J3 at NDHQ from 2004 to 2005. While there he provided day-to-day oversight of all Canadian Forces operations, both domestic and abroad. Over the course of his two years in this position, he was responsible for the oversight of 26 different operations around the globe including the DND response to the Effect of the 2004 Indian Ocean earthquake on Sri Lanka in 2004 and operations related to Canada's Role in the Afghanistan War.

Brett was appointed to the position of NORAD J3 from 2005 to 2008. He was responsible to execute NORAD's missions of Aerospace Warning and Aerospace Control for North America on authority of the Commander NORAD (first Admiral Timothy J. Keating and then Gen Gene Renuart. While there, Brett also led a team to transform the command centres of NORAD and United States Northern Command. The new command centre opened in 2008 He also created the North American Air Security Conference and encouraged participation by inter-agency partners such as the United States Department of Homeland Security and Public Safety Canada and many other inter-agency partners from both nations that are involved in security, defence and intelligence matters. In 2014 Brett was awarded the Legion of Merit in recognition of his work as the NORAD J3. The citation reads "For exceptionally meritorious service as Director of Operations, Headquarters North American Aerospace Defense Command, Peterson Air Force Base, Colorado, from May 2005 to August 2008."

== Retirement and beyond ==
Brett retired from the Canadian Forces in 2008. He completed his work on the writing of a 136-page book on Leadership and Strategic Planning that was based on the knowledge and experience that he derived from his 35 years of service to Canada and the United States. He currently operates a real estate and luxury homes business in Comox, British Columbia.
