= Vaino Olavi Partanen =

Canadian Cross of Valour recipient (1928–1969)

Chief Petty Officer 1st Class Vaino Olavi Partanen CV (27 May 1928 – 23 October 1969) was a member of the Canadian Forces and a recipient of the Cross of Valour for his actions during an engine room explosion aboard HMCS Kootenay on 23 October 1969. The Cross of Valour is Canada's highest decoration for bravery in non-combat circumstances. He was born in Antrea, Finland.

His citation reads:

CWO Vaino Olavi Partanen was chief engine room artificer aboard HMCS Kootenay. He remained at his post to inform the bridge when an explosion and fire devastated the engine room. HMCS Kootenay, one of seven "Restigouche"-class-destroyer-escorts in the Canadian Navy was conducting full power trials on 23 October 1969 in the Western Approaches to the English Channel with eight other Canadian ships. At 8:21 in the morning there was an explosion in the engine room. Intense heat, flame and smoke engulfed the engine room almost immediately and spread to adjacent passageways and to the boiler room. There were immediate orders to clear the engine room but CWO Partanen, in full knowledge that he was in mortal danger, remained behind in order to report the situation by telephone to the officer of watch on the bridge. He died moments after attempting to make his effort.

CPO1 Partanen, with his crewmate Petty Officer 2nd Class Lewis John Stringer (also posthumous), were the first recipients of the Cross of Valour. Both men were also recipients of the Canadian Forces' Decoration.
