= Éric Fortier =

Canadian recipient of the Medal of Bravery

Éric Fortier, M.B. of Gatineau, Quebec, Canada, is a recipient of the Medal of Bravery, a Canadian honour for acts of heroism, for fighting off an attack by a polar bear that mauled two other people.

The citation reads:

On July 27, 2001, Éric Fortier confronted a polar bear that was attacking two of his camping companions at the Soper River, in Katannilik Territorial Park Reserve, Nunavut. In the early morning hours, the bear ripped open the tent where Mr. Fortier and his partner were sleeping. Their screams drove the bear away but the animal turned on their friends, savagely mauling them as they tried to exit their own tent and escape. Ignoring the danger, Mr. Fortier threw rocks at the animal while yelling at it in an attempt to scare it off. Seeing that his efforts were in vain, he confronted the bear and stabbed it repeatedly in the throat with a pocketknife until the wounded animal retreated into the woods. Mr. Fortier and his partner then helped their injured friends into a canoe and paddled eight kilometres across the river to find help. The victims recovered from their injuries.
