= Lewis John Stringer =

Petty Officer 2nd Class Lewis John Stringer CV (1930–1969) was one of nine sailors who died aboard HMCS Kootenay in an incident for which he was posthumously awarded the Cross of Valour, Canada's second highest bravery decoration. He is commemorated on a plaque at Admiralty Garden, CFB Halifax.

The citation reads

"Sgt Lewis John Stringer of Dartmouth, Nova Scotia, and Hamilton, Ontario, who died from the effects of smoke inhaled while he organized the evacuation of men from the ship's cafeteria following an explosion aboard HMCS Kootenay. HMCS Kootenay, one of seven "Restigouche"-class destroyer-escorts in the Canadian navy was conducting full-power trials on October 23, 1969, in the western approaches to the English Channel with eight other Canadian ships. At 8:21 in the morning there was an explosion in the engine room. Intense heat, flame and smoke engulfed the engine room almost immediately and spread to adjacent passageways and to the boiler room. Sgt Stringer, a supply technician, was off-duty in the cafeteria. He understood the danger immediately and stepped into the exit to use his body to block the way to the smoke-filled passageway. He instructed others in the cafeteria to get down on the deck, breathe through their sleeves and crawl out by way of the galley. Sgt Stringer waited until the last man had made good his escape before attempting to leave himself. He collapsed in the galley and although rescued, he succumbed later."

PO2 Stringer, with his crewmate CPO1 Vaino Olavi Partanen (also posthumous), were the first recipients of the Cross of Valour. Both men were also recipients of the Canadian Forces' Decoration.
