= Martin Sceviour =

Canadian Cross of Valour recipient in 1981

Martin Sceviour CV of Burgoyne's Cove, Newfoundland and Labrador, was awarded Canada's highest decoration for bravery on April 6, 1981 for his efforts in the rescue of twelve crewman aboard the Danish trawler Remoy while caught out in rough seas.

== Citation ==
The official citation reads:

At the risk of perishing, Lester Fudge, along with Harold Miller and Martin Sceviour saved the lives of twelve crewmen trapped aboard the Danish trawler Remoy which was caught in strong seas and listing precariously some 13 kilometres out of Nain, Labrador, on 19 November 1978. Late at night, her call of distress was received in Nain and the fishing vessel Zermatt set out in the very worst of weather conditions, her progress hindered by winds of 100 kilometres per hour and freezing spray. She sailed as close as possible to the Remoy which had run aground on a sand reef, had lost her power, was heavily iced over and in imminent danger of capsizing. Messrs. Fudge, Miller and Sceviour volunteered to man a six-metre motor boat and attempt to rescue the stranded crewmen. The cold was so severe that no one could have survived even one minute if they had fallen into the sea. Progress was slow as the three men had to bail out water that the high winds and one and half metre waves pushed into their small craft. They succeeded in transferring seven men to the Zermatt and valiantly made their way a second time through slob ice and raging sea, and succeeded in getting the remaining crewmen to safety aboard the Zermatt.

== See also ==
- Cross of Valour
- Canadian Bravery Decorations
