= Douglas Fader =

Canadian Cross of Valour recipient

Douglas Fader CV is one of only 20 recipients of the Cross of Valour, awarded for acts of the most conspicuous courage in circumstances of extreme peril and the highest award for bravery which can be presented to a Canadian civilian.

This is his citation

After surviving a helicopter crash at the Birch Mountain microwave tower site in Alberta on August 27, 1993, Mr. Fader risked his life to save the pilot who was trapped in the burning wreckage. Without concern for his own life, Mr. Fader, who had been thrown from the aircraft, returned through the intense fire to release the pilot's seat belt and drag the man out through the flames. Although he sustained severe burns to his face, head and other parts of his body, Mr. Fader managed to help the pilot, who was in shock, reach a building on the site. Mr. Fader called 911 and, despite his own life-threatening injuries, stayed on the line for almost an hour until a rescue team arrived at the remote site. As a result of his heroic efforts, Mr. Fader spent many months recovering in hospital.
