= Amédéo Garrammone =

Canadian Cross of Valour recipient

Amédéo Garrammone CV a military police officer of CFB Halifax, received the Cross of Valour, Canada's second highest award for bravery, for risking his life to rescue a man who was being attacked.

Garrammone’s citation reads:

At the risk of his own life Pte. Amédéo Garrammone of CFB Halifax made a valiant attempt to assist another member of the Forces, a stranger, who was being stabbed by thugs in Halifax on 4 November 1978. Pte. Garrammone was returning to the base when he saw the victim being pursued by three men, one of them wielding a knife. The victim fell and was beaten and stabbed by the culprits. At the risk of his life Pte. Garrammone intervened and received a knife wound in the chest just below the heart. Bleeding profusely and barely conscious, he staggered to the gate of the base and was rushed by others to hospital where he underwent heart surgery. He survived but the other man succumbed to his wounds.
