= Kenneth Wilfrid Bishop =

Canadian Cross of Valour recipient

Kenneth Wilfrid Bishop CV is a recipient of the Cross of Valour, Canada's highest civilian award for bravery.

His citation reads:

On March 30, 1974, when a fuel tanker and freight truck collided and burst into flames at Vegreville, Alberta, Kenneth Bishop withstood severe burns to his body to save the life of a man who lay helpless in the midst of flames and explosions. On impact, the man was flung from his truck and suffered a serious injury. Some 7,000 gallons of gasoline from his ruptured tanker ignited and surrounded the driver within walls of fire. No one but Kenneth Bishop dared attempt to save the victim and as he approached the inferno, the rescuer was thrown several feet by an explosion. His clothes caught fire but he refused to turn away. Already severely burnt, Mr. Bishop protected his face from the blistering heat and snaked his way to the victim. Taking a firm grip of the man, under the arms, he dragged him safely away from the conflagration. Although aware that his deed might cost him his own life, Kenneth Bishop exhibited the finest example of selfless courage and humanitarian concern to save a complete stranger.
