= Keith Paul Mitchell =

Canadian Cross of Valour recipient

Sergeant Keith Paul Mitchell (now Chief Warrant Officer), CV, MMM, MSM, CD, a Search and Rescue technician with 413 Search and Rescue Squadron in the Canadian Forces, received the Cross of Valour, the highest Canadian award for acts of courage in circumstances of extreme peril, on September 18, 1998, along with Master Corporal Bryan Keith Pierce.

On November 12, 1996, Sergeant Mitchell and Master Corporal Pierce carried out an unprecedented parachute jump at night from a Hercules aircraft into freezing Arctic waters to provide medical aid to a critically ill fisherman on board a Danish fishing trawler located near Resolution Island. With inadequate flare illumination, Sergeant Mitchell and Master Corporal Pierce parachuted towards where a Zodiac boat was supposed to have been launched to pull them from the sea. Extremely strong winds carried the two men away from the vessel and landed them in freezing three-metre waves. Because of the heavy seas and severe icing conditions, they were unable to swim to the trawler. About 15 minutes later, with the men close to hypothermia, the ice-encrusted Zodiac finally reached them. They made it to the trawler, where they immediately treated the ill sailor and saved his life.

On the morning of June 9, 2008, the aircrew of Cormorant Helicopter Rescue 913 successfully evacuated a critically injured sailor from the MV Maersk Dunedin, near Halifax. Aircraft commander Lieutenant-Colonel Thibault made critical command decisions as he piloted the aircraft under exceptionally demanding circumstances. He was assisted by First Officer Captain Mercer, who helped fly the aircraft for nearly 10 hours, twice landing on Sable Island for fuel as the aircraft’s endurance was pushed to its limits. In conditions where visibility was so poor that they could not even see the vessel in distress, flight engineer Sergeant Pawulski was instrumental in providing advice to help guide the aircraft into position over the deck in order to facilitate the hoist operation. Search and rescue technicians Warrant Officer Mitchell and Sergeant Kelland were then lowered onto the heaving deck, where they rendered life-saving medical aid to the injured sailor and coordinated his removal to the rescue helicopter. The team's conduct, dedication and professionalism in the planning and execution of this daring rescue brought great credit to the Canadian Forces. The crew was awarded the Meritorious Service Medal and Lieutenant-Colonel Thibault was awarded the Meritorious Service Cross for their dedication to duty.

In 2014, Master Warrant Officer Keith Mitchell was appointed as a Member of the Order of Military Merit (MMM).

Chief Warrant Officer Keith Mitchell C.V., M.M.M., M.S.M., CD
| Allegiance | Canada |
| Awards | Cross of Valour, Order of Military Merit, Meritorious Service Medal, Canadian Forces Decoration |
