= Bryan Keith Pierce =

Canadian Cross of Valour recipient

Bryan Keith Pierce CV MMM MSC CD
- Allegiance: Canada
- Awards: Cross of Valour; Order of Military Merit; Meritorious Service Cross; Canadian Forces' Decoration

Chief Warrant Officer Bryan Keith Pierce CV MMM MSC CD is a technician in the Canadian Armed Forces search-and-rescue. He received the Cross of Valour, the highest Canadian award for acts of courage in circumstances of extreme peril, on September 18, 1998, along with Sergeant Keith Paul Mitchell.

On November 12, 1996, Sergeant Mitchell and Master Corporal Pierce carried out an unprecedented parachute jump at night from a Hercules aircraft into freezing Arctic waters to provide medical aid to a critically ill fisherman on board a Danish fishing trawler located near Resolution Island, Northwest Territories.

With inadequate flare illumination, Sergeant Mitchell and Master Corporal Pierce parachuted towards where a Zodiac boat was supposed to have been launched to pull them from the sea. Extremely strong winds carried the two men away from the vessel and landed them in freezing three-metre waves. Because of the heavy seas and severe icing conditions, they were unable to swim to the trawler. About 15 minutes later, with the men close to hypothermia, the ice-encrusted Zodiac finally reached them. They made it to the trawler, where they immediately treated the ill sailor and saved his life.

On January 3, 2007, parachute rescue team leader Warrant Officer Pierce and team member Sergeant Harrison performed a perilous procedure in a parachute jump to help a critically injured aircraft passenger, at Blatchford Lake, in the Northwest Territories. In the face of severe weather conditions, both performed a low-altitude jump, where the slightest error could have had catastrophic results for the team. The extraordinary level of professionalism demonstrated by Warrant Officer Pierce and Sergeant Harrison under these difficult circumstances brings great honour to the Canadian Forces and to Canada. For these actions, then-Warrant Officer Pierce and Sergeant Harrison were awarded the Meritorious Service Cross (Military Division).

In 2010, he was appointed as a Member of the Order of Military Merit (MMM).
