= Marcia V. J. Kran =

Canadian lawyer

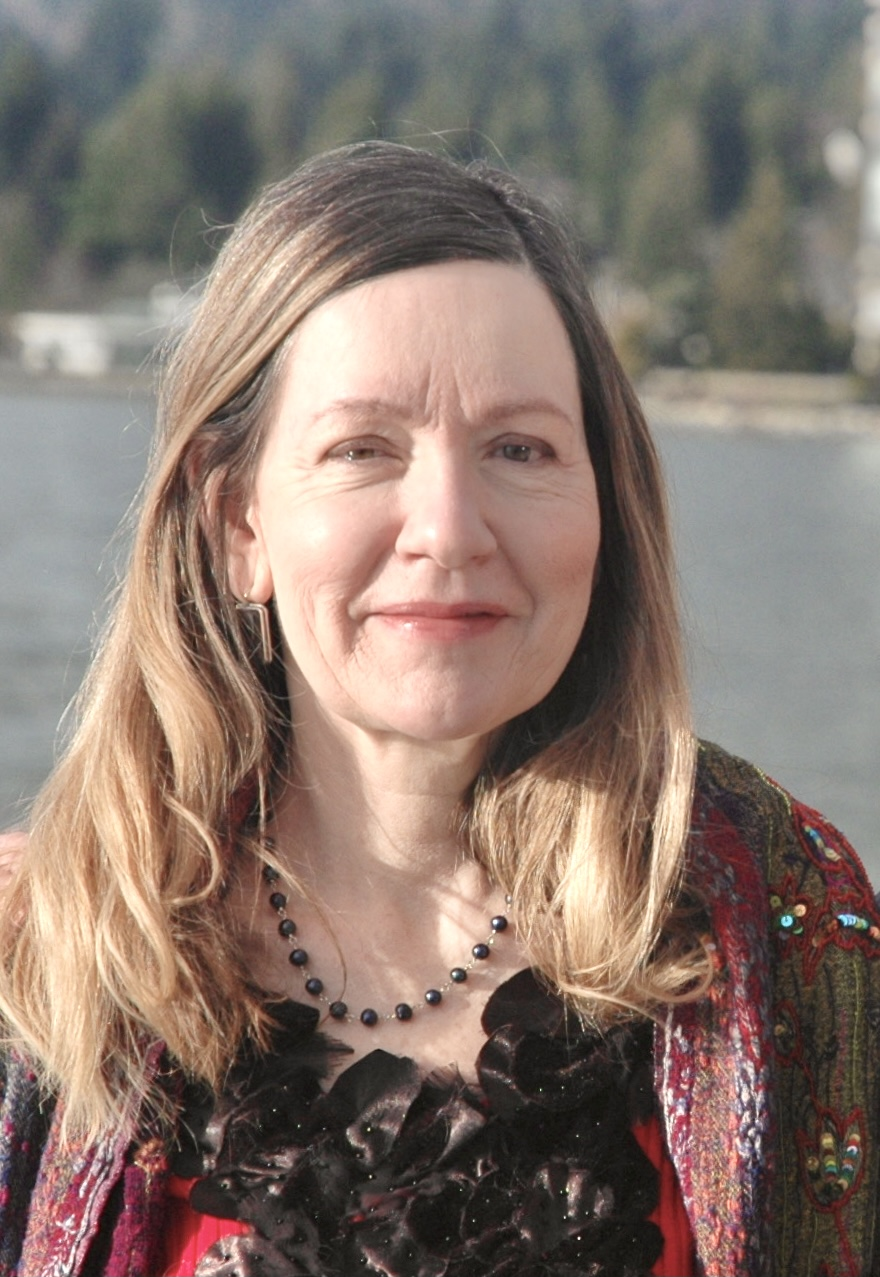
- Kran in 2021
- Born: Marcia Vaune Jocelyn Kran; Morris, Manitoba, Canada
- Died: January 17, 2026
- Education: University of Manitoba; University of Toronto
- Occupation: Human rights lawyer
- Spouse: Luis F. Molina

Marcia Vaune Jocelyn Kran OC (16 March 1957 - 17 January 2026) was a Canadian lawyer and expert member of the UN Human Rights Committee. Kran's career spanned international human rights law, criminal law and political science for over forty years, and included positions in academia and civil society. Kran held a range of senior United Nations positions, including in international human rights law.

== Biography ==
=== Early life ===
Born in Morris, Manitoba, Kran was one of two daughters of Esther and Emil Kran. She attended high school at Morris Collegiate. In 1975, she began her studies at the University of Manitoba in Winnipeg. Kran married Luis F. Molina, an international criminologist, in 1981. They lived in West Vancouver, Canada.

=== Education ===
Kran completed a B.A. in History and an LL.B. at the University of Manitoba (U of M) in 1980. She served as a student constable with the Winnipeg Police Department during the summer of 1979. While at U of M, she carried out two traineeships through the Association Internationale des Étudiants en Sciences Économiques et Commerciales (AISEC), an exchange programme for the development of young leaders, in Yugoslavia in 1978, and in Turkey in 1980.

In 1988, she received a Diploma in Social Sciences from the Stockholm University, and in 1989 she received an M.A. in Political Science from the University of Toronto, where she was a research assistant with the International Human Rights Programme. During her graduate studies at the University of Toronto, she and law student Catherine Bickley noticed the dearth of information for young lawyers interested in pursuing careers in international law. They compiled a list of resources addressed to this audience to meet this need. In the summer of 1993, she received a Certificate in Human Rights and Peace from the Aristotle University of Thessaloniki. Kran consistently seeks opportunities to share available knowledge and expand the resources for young lawyers interested in international law.

== Career ==
=== Canadian legal career ===
Kran began her legal career as a Crown Attorney in Winnipeg for the Province of Manitoba from 1981 to 1987. She prosecuted cases under the Criminal Code of Canada, including fraud, theft, robbery, sexual assault, and murder in Winnipeg, Manitoba. She was the first woman prosecutor to handle proceedings in several of Northern Manitoba's circuit courts.

In 1989, Kran became Legal Policy Counsel at the Canadian Department of Justice (DOJ) in Ottawa, advising on amendments to the Criminal Code and related laws, such as extradition and counter-terrorism legislation. In that capacity, she advised the Canadian Delegation to the UN Congress on Crime Prevention and Criminal Justice in Havana, Cuba in 1990, and participated in the negotiations between countries of several UN criminal justice standards such as the Basic Principles on the Role of Lawyers, Guidelines on the Role of Prosecutors, Basic Principles on the Use of Force and Firearms by Law Enforcement Officials, and the Basic Principles for the Treatment of Prisoners. Additionally, at the DOJ, Kran supervised the production of Strategies for Confronting Domestic Violence: A Resource Manual as a contribution to the UN Crime Prevention and Criminal Justice Programme at the UN in Vienna.

=== International legal career ===
In 1991, Kran was recruited by the Crime Prevention and Criminal Justice Branch of the United Nations Office in Vienna, Austria as a professional officer, where she offered technical support on criminal justice reform to various countries including Albania, Cambodia, Romania and the former Yugoslavia. She taught at UN workshops on human rights for judges, lawyers, prosecutors, and prison officials in Romania, and for law enforcement officials in Albania. Kran also contributed to UN model treaties on extradition and mutual legal assistance. She was the principal author of the first handbook on Criminal Justice Standards for UN Peacekeeping Police, which is still used today.

Kran joined the University of British Columbia's International Centre for Criminal Law Reform and Criminal Justice Policy, a UN affiliate institute, in 1994. As Senior Associate, she designed criminal justice reform projects and participated in the first training on human rights for UN peacekeeping police, which took place in Mozambique.

In 1995, Kran took up a post as a Human Rights Officer at the UN Centre for Human Rights in Geneva, Switzerland. She designed and oversaw implementation of country support projects to advance international human rights, notably in Vietnam and the Philippines. She also provided human rights training for UN peacekeeping police in the former Yugoslavia.

From 1997 to 2000, under the auspices of her firm, International Justice Consultants, Kran consulted for the UN and for the Canadian International Development Agency (CIDA) on human rights and rule of law. She carried out expert consultancy assignments in Albania, Armenia, Azerbaijan, Bhutan, Cambodia, China, Macedonia, Mongolia, Nepal, and Timor Leste. She also advised on research projects undertaken by the International Council on Human Rights Policy in Versoix, Switzerland.

In 2000, she moved to Phnom Penh and served as Senior Legal Advisor, sponsored by CIDA, to the Cambodian Ministry of Women's and Veterans’ Affairs, advising on strategies and reforms to advance women's equality in the country. She provided expert advice on the first law against domestic violence and the Cambodian government's report to the UN Committee on the Elimination of Discrimination against Women (CEDAW).

From 2001 to 2003, she served as the head of the National Criminal Justice Reform Programme at the Open Society Justice Initiative in Budapest, where she developed, managed, and guided the implementation of human rights and rule of law programming in Eastern Europe and the Commonwealth of Independent States (CIS).

In 2003, Kran became the Democratic Governance Team Leader at the UN Development Programme (UNDP) Regional Centre for Europe and the Commonwealth of Independent States in Bratislava. She led a team of advisors specializing in public administration reform, anti-corruption, e-governance, and human rights. She and members of her team carried out advisory missions to strengthen democratic governance in the 25 countries of the region.

From 2006 to 2009, she was based in Bangkok, Thailand, where she served as Head of Policy and Programmes at the UNDP Regional Centre for Asia and the Pacific, managing the provision of expert advice and regional support programmes to over 25 countries on a wide range of sustainable development issues including human rights, access to justice, anti-corruption, environmental protection, climate change mitigation and adaptation, and crisis prevention.

In 2009, Kran was named Director of the Research and Right to Development Division at the Office of the United Nations High Commissioner for Human Rights (OHCHR) in Geneva, one of three directors on the OHCHR senior management team. In that capacity, she traveled to many countries to participate in human rights meetings and events to advocate for human rights. She led a 100-person team of specialists who contributed to the policy positions of the High Commissioner for Human Rights, conducted research studies and organized panels for the UN Human Rights Council on priority human rights issues, and delivered advice to requesting states and civil society organizations on ways to improve the protection of human rights.

Kran advocated for human rights to be considered mainstream issues in the agenda of the UN as a whole. As Director, Kran collaborated with other UN offices and programs to integrate human rights issues into the organization's overall agenda including the Sustainable Development Goals (2015–2030). She represented the High Commissioner and OHCHR at the Human Rights Council and other high level UN events. Kran also participated in many human rights events, meetings and conferences to advocate for human rights in various countries. She contributed to publications to raise awareness about key human rights issues. She led OHCHR's visit to Myanmar to discuss with government officials the possibility of the establishment of a field office in the country.

In 2011, she contributed to a UNDP Asia-Pacific Regional Center report on climate change and human development, examining a human rights based approach to climate policy. In the same year she served as the first Chair of the Policy Board of the UN inter-agency Indigenous People's Partnership which funded projects in various countries to strengthen national implementation of the Declaration on the Rights of Indigenous Peoples.

Throughout her international service at OHCHR and UNDP, Kran advocated for the protection of all human rights – civil, cultural, economic, social and political rights – and for the integration of human rights into sustainable development efforts, as well as accountability for violations of rights, stating that "[g]overnance is not just about whether administration functions smoothly, it's about how people can review what those in power do, and how they can hold them to account."

=== UN Human Rights Committee ===
In 2016, Kran was nominated by the Government of Canada and elected to the UN Human Rights Committee (HRC) for a four-year term (2017–2020), the first Canadian to be elected to the Committee in over a decade. As a member, Kran regularly engaged with officials from States that report to the Committee, focusing on the lived experience of persons in those countries seeking to exercise their civil and political rights. On the HRC, Kran served as Special Rapporteur on Follow-Up to Concluding Observations in 2019 – 2021, leading the process to assess the implementation of Committee recommendations at the national level. As Special Rapporteur, she was invited to Lao P.D.R. to present a keynote address on Human Rights Day and advise the government on strengthening the national implementation of UN human rights recommendations. She consistently spotlighted and championed the importance of the follow-up procedure in ensuring that the work of the Committee results in concrete action by States parties, as a means of making tangible progress towards key human rights goals.

In 2020, she was elected for a second term, receiving votes from 109 countries.

Kran also recommended actions for States and the UN to achieve gender parity on the UN human rights committees, consisting of the ten treaty bodies, asserting that, without equal representation of women, the committees risk overlooking matters and perspectives that should be part of their legal agenda. Among the actions she proposed are States nominating more women candidates, reforming nomination processes to ensure that qualified women are not left unaware of vacancies, official tracking of gender parity across the 10 committees, informal mentorship of candidates on the election process, and an explicit policy statement from the High Commissioner calling for parity and prioritizing gender equality in the committees.

Kran was a strong proponent of bringing the work of the human rights treaty bodies closer to rightsholders and states by holding some committee sessions at UN regional headquarters around the world. She argued that this would more fully engage stakeholders in committee reviews of countries' progress on civil and political rights and strengthen support for the implementation of Committee recommendations.

Kran raised the need for increased visibility and access to the work of the Committee for it to be effective as an international accountability mechanism. Part of a successful strategy for the UN High Commissioner for Human Rights (HC) would be to leverage a range of UN mandates to advance human rights globally. "[The HC's] robust support to other actors who are part of the UN human rights system, such as treaty bodies scrutinizing human rights globally, would significantly boost the prospect of achieving progress on international human rights protection."

She actively advocated for promoting the role of civil society in the protection of human rights.

=== Mentoring and lectures ===
As a proponent of the importance of human rights education, Kran has offered lectures and interviews on the value of the work of the Human Rights Committee and mentored students aspiring to work in the area of international human rights. These include students at the Geneva Academy for International Humanitarian Law and Human Rights; Sutherland School of Law, University College Dublin; Schulich School of Law at Dalhousie University, Halifax; the University of Toronto Faculty of Law; the University of Ottawa Faculty of Law; and the International Human Rights Law Clinic at the Allard School of Law, University of British Columbia, Vancouver. As part of her mentorship efforts, she served on the Honor Jury for the Human Rights Essay Awards at the Academy on Human Rights and Humanitarian Law of the American University Washington College of Law in 2018 and 2019.

== Selected publications ==
In addition to contributing to numerous UN reports, Kran has published several law-related works including the following:

- 2022: "Revitalizing the UN human rights treaty bodies through regionalization", OpenGlobalRights.
- 2021: "Gender Parity in the UN's Human-Rights Treaty Bodies Is Sorely Lacking", PassBlue.
- 2020: "The UN Human Rights Treaty Bodies: An Overview" Lawyers' Rights Watch Canada.
- 2019: "Following up—the key to seeing states act on treaty body recommendations" Open Global Rights.
- 2017: "How Canada Can Walk the Talk at the UN on the Rule of Law – Within and Beyond our Borders", in Canada and the Rule of Law 150 Years After Confederation, International Commission of Jurists Canada. Ottawa, 2017, 143–150.
- 2003: Report NGO Forum, "Promoting partnerships between governments, NGOs and international organizations", Community of Democracies, Bucharest, Romania, November 2003, 22–23.
- 1999: "Bhutan's Approach to Human Rights", Bhutan: A Fortress at the Edge of Time. Selected Papers of the Bhutan Seminar 1998, Vienna: VIDC-Austrian Development Cooperation.
- 1996: "Protecting the Interests of Victims at a Permanent International Criminal Tribunal", in Fostering Compliance in International Law. Ottawa: Proceedings of the 1996 Conference of the Canadian Council of International Law, 94-102.
- 1994: "Review of Human Rights of Women: National and International Perspectives. Edited by Rebecca J. Cook". Canadian Yearbook of International Law / Annuaire Canadien De Droit International 32, Cambridge University Press, 397–402.
- 1992: "The impact of human rights principles on extradition from Canada and the United States: The role of national courts", Criminal Law Forum 3, 1992, 225–270.

== Awards ==
In 2005, Kran was awarded the Walter S. Tarnopolsky Prize by the Canadian section of the International Commission of Jurists for "an outstanding contribution to [...] international human rights." In 2006, she received a Celebrated Alumnus Award from the University of Manitoba's Faculty of Arts.

In 2020, she was appointed to the Order of Canada as an officer for her contributions to the advancement of international human rights and development, and for her steadfast advocacy of democratic governance.

The official ceremony to induct Kran as an officer of the Order of Canada took place on December 1, 2022 at the residence of Governor General of Canada, Mary Simon, Rideau Hall in Ottawa, with the following remarks,

Marcia V. J. Kran has been advancing democratic governance and access to justice worldwide for more than three decades. Sought after for her integrity and extensive experience, she has forged effective partnerships with countries developing democratic practices, and her advocacy has empowered people to understand and exercise their fundamental human rights. Currently an expert member of the United Nations Human Rights Committee, Ms. Kran has also contributed her expertise to the UN Development Programme and the UN Human Rights Office.

Also on December 1, 2022, Kran and her husband Luis F. Molina attended the Senate of Canada where the Speaker announced her induction that day into the Order of Canada.
