= Karen M. Weiler =

The Honourable Karen Merle Weiler CM OOnt (born on June 13, 1945) is a retired justice of the Court of Appeal for Ontario and the Court Martial Appeal Court of Canada.

The daughter of Edgar Magnuson and Rose Beliveau, she was born in Spiritwood, Saskatchewan. Weiler received a BA from the University of Saskatchewan. She is a graduate of Osgoode Hall Law School with an LL.B. and later an LL.M. She was called to the Ontario bar in 1969. Besides practising law from 1969 to 1973, she was a lecturer at Lakehead University and an instructor in family law. She served as solicitor for the Ontario Ministry of Community and Social Services and later as counsel for the Ministry of the Attorney General of Ontario.

In 1967, she married Robert David Weiler, QC; the couple have two daughters. Her brother-in-law is Prof. Paul C. Weiler OC.

Weiler was appointed to the former District Court of Ontario in 1980, to the former Ontario High Court in 1989, to the Ontario Court of Appeal in 1992, and to the Court Martial Appeal Court of Canada in 1995

Weiler's appointment to the Order of Canada was announced on June 27, 2019. She was appointed "For her lifelong service to family law as a lawyer and federal judge." Her appointment to the Order of Ontario was announced on January 1, 2021. Her appointment read: "Karen Weiler is recognized for her transformative work respecting the Family Law Reform Act while counsel for the Attorney General. Her distinguished judicial career spanned 37 years, including 25 on the Court of Appeal during which she helped disabled and unrepresented litigants gain equal access to justice. Presently, she is a Director of Covenant House Toronto and volunteers with Innocence Canada."

York University, the Law Society of Ontario, and Lakehead University awarded Weiler honorary Doctor of Laws degrees in 2017, 2015 and 1992, respectively.

Weiler recently sat on the Board of Directors of Covenant House Toronto.
