= Medal of Bravery (Canada) =

Third-highest award for non-military bravery

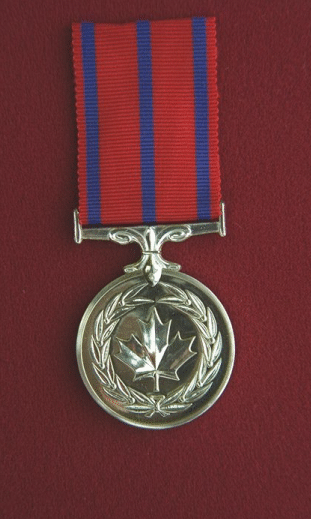
- Obverse of the medal
- Type: State decoration
- Awarded for: Acts of bravery in hazardous circumstances
- Presented by: The governor general of Canada
- Post-nominals: MB
- Status: Currently awarded
- Established: 1 May 1972
- First award: 20 July 1972

Highlights
- Total: 3,304
- Ribbon bars of the Medal of Bravery (MB with Bar at bottom)

Precedence
- Next (higher): Medal of Military Valour
- Next (lower): Meritorious Service Medal

The Medal of Bravery (French: Médaille de la Bravoure) is a decoration that is, within the Canadian system of honours, the third-highest award for bravery, and one of the three Canadian Bravery Decorations awarded by the governor general of Canada. Created in 1972, it is presented to both living and deceased individuals deemed to have performed "acts of bravery in hazardous circumstances". Recipients are allowed to use the post-nominal letters MB.

== Design ==
The Medal of Bravery is in the form of a 31.8 millimetres (1.25 in) diameter silver medal with, on the reverse, the Royal Cypher of the reigning monarch beneath a St. Edward's Crown, symbolizing the Canadian monarch's role as the fount of honour, and the inscription BRAVERY • BRAVOURE. The obverse bears a maple leaf surrounded by a laurel wreath, and the name and rank of the recipient is engraved on the medal's edge.

This medallion is worn on the left chest, on a 31.8mm wide ribbon coloured red with three vertical blue stripes: for men, hung from a bar, and for women, on a ribbon bow, both pinned to the left chest. Individual already possessing a Medal of Bravery be awarded the medal again for subsequent acts of bravery are granted a medal bar, in silver and bearing a maple leaf, for wear on the ribbon from which the original medal is suspended.

== Eligibility and receipt ==
On 1 May 1972, Queen Elizabeth II, on the advice of her Cabinet under Prime Minister Pierre Trudeau, created the Medal of Bravery to recognize acts of great gallantry. The name of any person, living or deceased, may be submitted to the Canadian Decorations Advisory Council— a part of the Chancellery of Honours at Government House— as a possible recipient of the Medal of Bravery. It is not necessary that the act of bravery take place in Canada, nor must the person who carried out the act be a Canadian; however, the event must have involved Canadians and/or Canadian interests. Nominations can be made no later than two years following either the act of bravery itself or the conclusion of any coroner's or court's inquest into the events for which the person was nominated. Once they have been decorated with the Medal of Bravery, recipients are granted the right to use the post-nominal letters MB. As of August 2009, the Medal of Bravery has been presented to at least 3300 people, and there have been at least two Bars issued.

== Commemoration ==
The Royal Canadian Mint in 2006 released a general circulation commemorative quarter showing on the reverse a variation of the design of the Medal of Bravery.

== Recipients ==
The following are some notable recipients of the Medal of Bravery:

- Charles Stanley Winsor MB*, awarded 27 August 1990 and awarded bar 10 May 1999
- Robert Binder MB, awarded 26 November 2010
- Mary Margaret 'Diane' Brock MB, awarded 2 December 1977
- Dennis Robinson MB CD, awarded 7 May 1984
- Joseph Jacques Mario Charette MB, awarded 1 February 1994
- Konrad Lionel Shourie MB, awarded 18 April 2002
- Éric Fortier MB, awarded 18 April 2002
- M. Mohamed Chelali MB, awarded 19 June 2003
- Paul Landry MB, awarded 26 February 2002
- John Boyarski MB, awarded 19 August 1989
- Gerry Dawson MB, awarded 10 May 1999
- Brett Cairns MB, awarded 11 Dec 1989
- Milton Keith Chute MB, awarded 21 June 1991
- Ranger Fontaine Robert Fiddler MB CD, awarded 23 November 2017
- James Arthur (Jae) Elvish MB* awarded 27 September 2013 and awarded Bar 30 September 2015
- Gillian Irene MacAulay MB, awarded 22 October 2010

== See also ==
- Canadian order of precedence (decorations and medals)
- State decoration
