= Star of Courage (Canada) =

Second-highest non-military bravery award

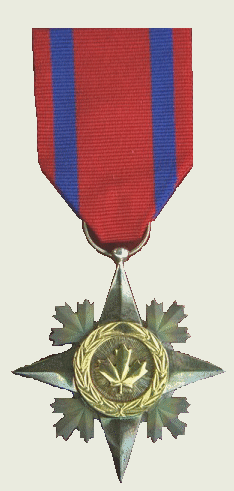
- Obverse of the insignia
- Type: State decoration
- Awarded for: Acts of conspicuous courage in circumstances of great peril
- Presented by: Governor general of Canada
- Eligibility: All Canadian citizens and foreign persons as described
- Post-nominals: SC (English); ÉC (French)
- Status: Currently awarded
- Established: 1 May 1972
- First award: 20 July 1972

Highlights
- Total: 420
- Total awarded posthumously: 76
- Ribbon bars of the Star of Courage (SC with Bar at bottom)

Precedence
- Next (higher): Star of Military Valour
- Next (lower): Meritorious Service Cross

The Star of Courage (French: Étoile du Courage) is a decoration that is the second-highest award for bravery within the Canadian system of honours, and one of the three Canadian Bravery Decorations awarded by the governor general of Canada. Created in 1972, it is presented to both living and deceased individuals deemed to have performed "acts of conspicuous courage in circumstances of great peril". Recipients are allowed to use post-nominal letters – for Anglophones SC, and for Francophones ÉC.

== Design ==
The Star of Courage is in the form of a 38 millimetres (1.5 in) wide silver compass star Celeste with a maple leaf in each angle. On the obverse is a gold roundel at the centre of the star, bearing a maple leaf surrounded by a laurel wreath. The reverse bears on the upper arm the Royal Cypher of the reigning monarch beneath a St. Edward's Crown, symbolizing the Canadian monarch's role as the fount of honour, and the inscription COURAGE. Below this is engraved the name and rank of the recipient.

This medallion is worn on the left chest, on a 38 millimetres (1.5 in) wide ribbon coloured red with two vertical blue stripes: for men, hung from a bar, and for women, on a ribbon bow, both pinned to the left chest. Individuals already possessing a Star of Courage who are awarded the medal again for subsequent acts of bravery, are granted a medal bar, in gold and bearing a maple leaf, for wear on the ribbon from which the original medal is suspended; a small gold maple leaf is also added to the ribbon bar.

== Eligibility and receipt ==
On 1 May 1972, Queen Elizabeth II, on the advice of her Cabinet under Prime Minister Pierre Trudeau, created the Star of Courage to recognize acts of great bravery. Any person, living or deceased, may be nominated for the Star of Courage; it is not necessary that the act of bravery take place in Canada, nor must the person who carried out the act be a Canadian. However, the event must have involved Canadians and/or Canadian interests. Nominations can be made no later than two years following either the act of bravery itself or the conclusion of any coroner's or court's inquest into the events for which the person was nominated. As of October 2019, the Star of Courage has been presented to 461 people.

== See also ==
- Canadian order of precedence (decorations and medals)
- State decoration
