= Canadian Bravery Decorations =

Non-military award in the Canadian Honours System

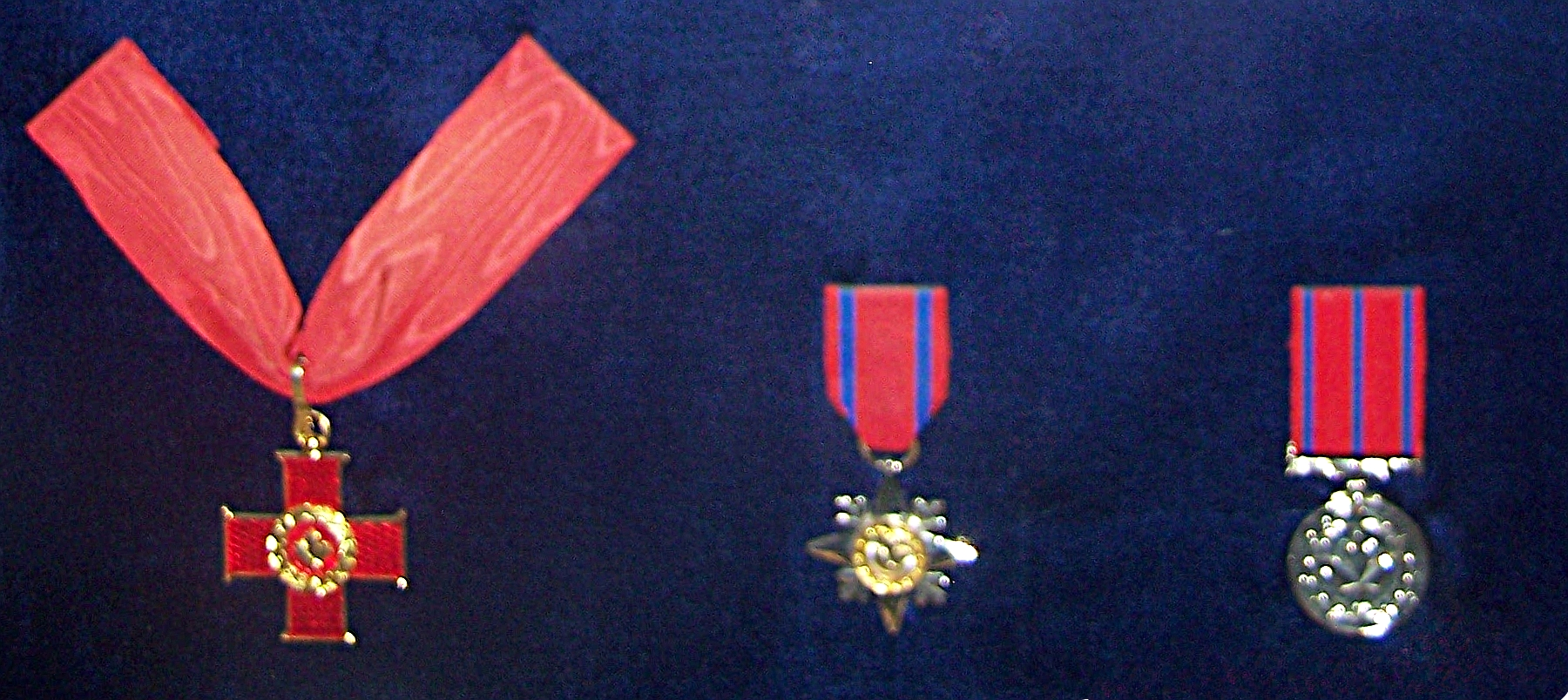
Cross of Valour, Star of Courage, Medal of Bravery (from left to right)

The Canadian Bravery Decorations are a group of three Canadian decorations that are awarded for bravery. They were established in 1972 and are part of the Canadian Honours System that was created in 1967.

The Canadian Bravery Decorations recognize courageous acts in all situations not in the presence of an armed enemy. They are different from the Canada Bravery Awards, which are administered by the Royal Canadian Humane Association.

The three Canadian Bravery Decorations are as follows, in order of precedence:

- Cross of Valour
- Star of Courage
- Medal of Bravery
