= List of members of Canada's Sports Hall of Fame =

This list shows all the recipients of the Order of Sport and members of Canada's Sports Hall of Fame.

== Inductees ==
Year	Name	Sport	Category	Achievements	Ref
1976	Bob Abate	Amateur sports	Builder	Coached 57 teams and won 200 amateur city, provincial and national championship titles.	
2010	Bob Ackles	Football	Builder	Administrator of the BC Lions. Inducted to Canadian Football Hall of Fame.	
1975	Jack Adams	Ice hockey	Builder	Played for the Toronto Arenas, Vancouver Millionaires, Toronto St. Patricks and Ottawa Senators. Won Stanley Cups with the Toronto Arenas and Ottawa Senators. Coach and general manager for Detroit Red Wings (seven Stanley Cups and twelve NHL championships).	
2018	Jeff Adams	Wheelchair racing	Athlete	Six-time world champion and thirteen time Paralympic medallist	
2018	Damon Allen	Football	Athlete	Four-time Grey Cup champion	
1955	Frank Amyot	Canoe / Kayak Sprint	Athlete	Won Canada's only gold medal at the 1936 Berlin Olympics for 1,000m singles and set Olympic record.	
1964	Doug Anakin	Bobsleigh	Athlete	Member of the gold medal-winning Canadian bobsleigh team at the 1964 Innsbruck Olympics	
1973	George Anderson	Soccer	Builder	Resurrected the Canadian Football Soccer Association, which later became the Canadian Soccer Association.	
1975	Syl Apps	Ice hockey	Athlete	Received the Lady Byng Memorial Trophy in 1942. Won the Stanley Cup with the Toronto Maple Leafs in 1947 and 1948. Named to Order of Canada in 1977.	
1957	Donald Arnold	Rowing	Athlete	Won Canada's first-ever rowing gold medal in the 1956 Melbourne Olympics.	
1974	George Athans	Water skiing	Athlete	Broke 28 Canadian records and winning ten consecutive national titles from 1966 to 1975.	
1999	Marcel Aubut	Ice hockey	Builder	Was the president and chief executive officer of the Quebec Nordiques. Pushed for the adoption of the overtime period in the NHL. Championed the use of video replay for adjudication purposes.	
2015	Susan Auch	Speed skating	Athlete	Won medals at the 1994 and 1998 Winter Olympics.	
2005	Don Awrey	Ice hockey	Athlete	Played for Canada in the 1972 Summit Series	
2004	Donovan Bailey	Athletics	Athlete	Won gold medal for 100m and 4 × 100 m relay at the 1996 Atlanta Olympics. Was the world record holder of 9.84 seconds for 100m race from 1996 to 1999.	
1971	Dan Bain	Multisport	Athlete	Won the 1891 Campbell Rowley Trophy – Winnipeg All-round Gymnastic Championship. Was the winner of the Carruthers' Cup – one-mile bicycle championship from 1894 to 1896. Won the Stanley Cup with the Winnipeg Victorias in 1896 and 1901.	
2018	Mary Baker	Baseball	Athlete	First All-American Girls Professional Baseball League athlete and first Canadian woman broadcaster	
1955	Norm Baker	Basketball	Athlete	In 1939, at the age of 16, he was the youngest to play for Canadian Championship Basketball Team. In 1943, he set the Canadian scoring record of 38 points in a single game while playing for the Royal Canadian Air Force team.	
1969	Al Balding	Golf	Athlete	First Canadian to win the PGA Tour event (Mayfair Open) in 1955. Miller Trophy winner (1952, 1954, 1958, 1961)	
1973	Matt Baldwin	Curling	Athlete	Won the Macdonald Brier, the Alberta Curling Association Bonspiel grand aggregate, and the Edmonton ACT car bonspiel. Youngest skip to win Canadian championships in his time (1954).	
1959	James Ball	Athletics	Athlete	Won silver medal for 400m race in 1928 Amsterdam Olympics and a bronze medal for 1600m relay in 1932 Los Angeles Olympics	
1963	Norval Baptie	Speed skating	Athlete	Won world title in 1897. One of the first skaters inducted into U.S. Skating Hall of Fame.	
2013	Kirsten Barnes	Rowing	Athlete	Won two gold medals at the 1991 World Rowing Championships. Won two gold medals at the 1992 Barcelona Olympics	
2015	Earl W. Bascom	Rodeo	Builder	Rodeo pioneer 1916–1940, Father of Modern Rodeo, All-Around Champion, rodeo equipment inventor, set 1933 world record time, introduced brahma bull riding to rodeo, rodeo sport artist.	
2001	Carling Bassett-Seguso	Tennis	Athlete	Top-ranked player in Canada from 1982 to 1986. Reached semifinals in the 1984 US Open. Won Canadian Press Female Athlete of the Year twice in 1983 and 1985.	
1975	Harry Batstone	Football	Athlete	Won the 1921 Grey Cup (Dominion) with Toronto Argonauts. Won the Grey Cup with Queen's University Golden Gaels from 1922 to 1924.	
2020–21	Jackie Barrett	Power Lifting / Special Olympics Athlete	Athlete	13 Gold and 2 Silver medals over four appearances at Special Olympics World Summer Games.	
1973	David Bauer	Ice hockey	Builder	Formed Canada's first national hockey team to compete in Olympics (1964, 1968). Led the Canadian ice hockey national team to win bronze at the 1968 Grenoble Olympics.	
2005	Steve Bauer	Cycling – Road	Athlete	Won four Canadian National Championship titles from 1978 to 1996. Received the silver medal at the 1984 Los Angeles Olympics. First Canadian to win a stage on the Tour de France in 1990.	
1987	Alex Baumann	Swimming	Athlete	Set world records in 200m and 400m. Won a gold medal in the 1984 Los Angeles Olympics.	
1998	Myriam Bédard	Biathlon	Athlete	Became the first Canadian to win the 1991 World Cup biathlon. Won a bronze medal in the 1992 Albertville Olympics in 15 km (first ever Canadian Olympic biathlon medalist); two gold medals in the 1994 Lillehammer Olympics.	
1996	Robert Bédard	Tennis	Athlete	Was the number one ranked tennis player in Canada from 1955 to 1965. Won the Canadian Open three times (1955, 1957, 1958).	
1979	George Beers	Lacrosse	Builder	Known as the "Father of Lacrosse". Published pamphlet outlining rules of lacrosse in 1860 and formed the National Lacrosse Association in 1867.	
2005	Paul Beeston	Baseball	Builder	Was the president of the Toronto Blue Jays from 1989 to 1997. Became the president and COO of the Major League Baseball from 1997 to 2002.	
1956	Frenchy Belanger	Boxing	Athlete	In 1929, he won the Canadian title and reached the World Flyweight Championship semifinals.	
1975	Jean Béliveau	Ice hockey	Athlete	Captain of the Montreal Canadiens from 1961 to 1971. Won the Art Ross Trophy for most points scored in a season in 1956 and the Hart Trophy for NHL's Most Valuable Player twice (1956, 1964). Received the Conn Smythe Trophy for Most Valuable Player in the playoffs in 1965.	
1955	Jane Bell	Athletics	Athlete	A member of the 'Matchless Six', Canada's first women's Olympic track team. Won the gold medal for the 4 × 100 m relay in the 1928 Amsterdam Olympics.	
1958	Marilyn Bell	Swimming	Athlete	In 1954, she swam 26-mile marathon in Atlantic City and became the first person to swim across Lake Ontario (in 20 hours and 58 minutes). Won the Northern Star Award for Canada's most outstanding athlete. Became the youngest person to swim the English Channel in 1955.	
1996	Big Ben	Equestrian	Athlete	Won two gold medals at the 1987 Pan American Games and two consecutive World Cups (1988, 1989); first horse to do so. More than 40 Grand Prix victories	
2005	Gary Bergman	Ice hockey	Athlete	Played for Team Canada in 1972.	
2005	Gordon 'Red' Berenson	Ice hockey	Athlete	Played for Team Canada in 1972.	
2019	Guylaine Bernier	Rowing	Builder	Part of the Canadian women's rowing team at the 1976 Montreal Olympics; made significant contributions to rowing umpiring, organization, and education	
1987	Sylvie Bernier	Diving	Athlete	Won gold medal in 3m in the 1984 Los Angeles Olympics.	
2025	Martha Billes	Sports Administration	Builder	co-founded Canadian Tire Jumpstart Charities	
2019	Alexandre Bilodeau	Freestyle Skiing	Athlete	Gold Medal in moguls at the 2010 Olympic Winter Games in Vancouver; the first Canadian athlete ever to win an Olympic Gold medal on home soil	
1982	Jack Bionda	Lacrosse	Athlete	Played for the Toronto Maple Leafs and Boston Bruins. Won Commissioner's Trophy for Most Valuable Player in 1959 and Mike Kelly Medal for Most Outstanding Player in the Mann Cup twice (1959, 1962).	
1975	Toe Blake	Ice hockey	Builder	Won the Hart Trophy & Art Ross Trophy (1938–1939). Coached Montreal Canadiens from 1955 to 1968 (team won eight Stanley Cups)	
1955	The Bluenose	Sailing	Athlete	Undefeated champion of International Fisherman's Trophy race (1921–1938).	
1958	Gilmour Boa	Shooting	Athlete	Won King's Prize at Bisley (1951). In 1954, he won a gold medal at World Championships with world record score of 598 out of 600 points. Won bronze medal in 1956 Melbourne Olympics.	
1977	Martin Boland	Rowing	Athlete	Member of the Outer Cove Rowing Crew, winners of the Fisherman's Race in 1901 in a record time of 9 minutes and 13 seconds	
1977	Arnie Boldt	Para Athletics	Athlete	Won gold medal in high jump and gold medal in long jump in 1976 Summer Paralympics. Broke world records.	
2023	Phyllis Bomberry	Softball	Athlete	Won three Canadian championships. First female winner of the Tom Longboat Award.	
2007	Mike Bossy	Ice hockey	Athlete	Won Calder Memorial Trophy (1977–1978) and Conn Smythe Trophy as Stanley Cup Playoffs Most Valuable Player (1982). Won Lady Byng Trophy (1983, 1984, 1986).	
1975	Frank Boucher	Ice hockey	Builder	Coached New York Rovers and New York Rangers (won Stanley Cup in 1940). Was General Manager of New York Rangers from 1949 to 1955.	
1984	Gaétan Boucher	Speed skating	Athlete	Won silver medal in 1000m in 1980 Lake Placid Olympics. Won bronze medal in 500m and gold medals in 100m and 1500m in 1984 Sarajevo Olympics. First Canadian male to win an individual gold medal at a Winter Olympics.	
2015	Jocelyne Bourassa	Golf	Builder	Decorated amateur golfer; championed development of women's golf	
2019	Colette Bourgonje	Para Nordic Skiing & Para Athletics	Athlete	First Canadian woman to medal in both Summer and Winter Paralympic Games; 10-time Paralympic medallist	
2011	Ray Bourque	Ice hockey	Athlete	2001 Stanley Cup champion with the Colorado Avalanche; 5-time NHL top defenceman	
1955	Norris Bowden	Figure skating	Athlete	Won Canadian Men's Single Figure Skating title in 1947. Won World Championships in 1954 and 1955 with partner Francis Dafoe – the first Canadians to win a world pairs figure skating title; 1956 Cortina d'Ampezzo Olympics silver medallist	
1999	Johnny Bower	Ice hockey	Athlete	Won Vezina Trophy twice (1961, 1965) and Stanley Cups with Toronto Maple Leafs (1962–1967).	
2004	Scotty Bowman	Ice hockey	Builder	Coached most Stanley Cup winning teams (9 teams).	
1975	Ab Box	Football	Athlete	Won Grey Cup with Toronto Balmy Beach in 1930 and with Toronto Argonauts in 1933. Won Jeff Russel Memorial Trophy in 1934.	
1979	Beverly Boys	Diving	Athlete	Won silver medal in 10m and bronze in 3m in 1966 Kingston Commonwealth Games. In 1970, she won two gold medals in Edinburgh Commonwealth Games. Held 34 Canadian titles.	
1996	Isabelle Brasseur	Figure skating	Athlete	2-time Olympic bronze medallist (1992, 1994); 1993 World Champion; 3-time World Championship silver medallist (1990, 1991, 1994) with partner Lloyd Eisler	
2010	Jean-Luc Brassard	Freestyle skiing	Athlete	Won gold medal in moguls in 1994 Lillehammer Olympics.	
1975	Joe Breen	Football	Athlete	Was captain of Toronto Argonauts in 1924. Coach of the University of Western Ontario Mustangs from 1929 to 1934.	
2002	Carl Brewer	Ice hockey	Builder	Won the Stanley Cup with Toronto Maple Leafs (1962, 1963, 1964). Player-coach for IFK Helsinki team in Finland (1968–1969).	
1956	Cal Bricker	Athletics	Athlete	Won bronze medal in running broad jump in 1908 London Olympics and silver medal in running broad jump in 1912 Stockholm Olympics.	
2024	Debbie Brill	Athletics	Athlete		
2019	Martin Brodeur	Ice hockey	Athlete	Three time Stanley Cup champion with the New Jersey Devils	
1956	Eugene Brosseau	Boxing	Athlete	Renowned amateur/professional boxer during the World War I era, in the welterweight and middleweight classes.	
1955	Lou Brouillard	Boxing	Athlete	World boxing champion in 1931 as a welterweight, and in 1933 as a middleweight.	
1956	George Brown	Rowing	Athlete	Won significant local and international races in single-sculls between 1864 and 1874.	
1994	Kurt Browning	Figure Skating	Athlete	Won the World Figure Skating Championship in 1989, 1990, 1991 and 1993. First skater to execute a quadruple toe loop in competition.	
2009	Caroline Brunet	Canoe / Kayak Sprint	Athlete	10-time World champion; 3-time Olympic medallist; Northern Star Award winner (1999)	
2014	Horst Bulau	Ski jumping	Athlete	4-time Olympian	
1996	Ellen Burka	Figure skating	Builder	Successful coach; trained 26 Canadian medallists at World Championship and Olympic level	
1965	Petra Burka	Figure skating	Athlete	Olympic bronze medallist (1964); Northern Star Award winner (1965); Bobbie Rosenfeld Award winner (1964, 1965)	
1977	Sylvia Burka	Speed skating	Athlete	3-time World champion	
1972	Desmond Burke	Shooting – Rifle	Athlete	Youngest ever to win The King's Prize (1924)	
2014	Sarah Burke	Freestyle skiing	Athlete	World champion (2005)	
2015	George Burleigh	Swimming	Athlete	3-time medallist at the 1930 British Empire Games, including a gold in the 800 yard freestyle relay	
1955	Tommy Burns	Boxing	Athlete	World Heavyweight Title (1906)	
1997	Larry Cain	Canoe / Kayak Sprint	Athlete	2-time Olympic medallist (1984), including a gold in C1 500	
2015	Frank Calder	Ice hockey	Builder	First president of the National Hockey League; Calder Memorial Trophy named for him	
1969	Jackie Callura	Boxing	Athlete	World featherweight title (1942)	
1991	Michelle Cameron	Synchronized swimming	Athlete	Olympic gold medallist (1988); 2-time World champion; Commonwealth Games champion (1986)	
2007	Cassie Campbell	Ice hockey	Athlete	2-time Olympic gold medallist (2002, 2006); 6-time World champion	
1975	Clarence Campbell	Ice hockey	Builder	President of the National Hockey League	
2020–21	Duncan Campbell	Wheelchair rugby	Builder	Co-inventor of wheelchair rugby (aka "murderball")	
2009	John Campbell	Horse racing	Athlete	3-time Little Brown Jug winner; 6-time Hambletonian Stakes winner	
2009	Hugh Campbell	Football	Builder	CFL coach of the year (1979)	
2001	Herb Carnegie	Ice hockey	Athlete	Founded Future Aces Hockey School	
1955	Ethel Catherwood	Athletics	Athlete	A member of the 'Matchless Six', Canada's first women's Olympic track team. Won the gold medal for the 4 × 100 m relay in the 1928 Amsterdam Olympics.	
2022	Chatham Coloured All-Stars: Earl 'Flat' Chase; Andy Harding; Len Harding; Sagasta Harding; Wilfrid 'Boomer' Harding; Ferguson Jenkins Sr.; Gouy Ladd; Clifford Olbey; Stanton Robbins; Hyle Robbins; Wellington 'Willie' Shaugnosh; Don Tabron; Ross Talbot; King Terrell; Don Washington	Baseball	Trailblazer	Black baseball team from 1930s	
1971	George Chenier	Snooker	Athlete	North American Snooker Champion	
2015	Billy Christmas	Multisport	Athlete	Champion in boxing, rugby, lacrosse, and ice hockey	
1990	George Chuvalo	Boxing	Athlete	Canadian Heavyweight Champion (1956)	
1975	King Clancy	Ice hockey	Athlete	3-time Stanley Cup champion (1923, 1927, 1932); Vice-president of the Toronto Maple Leafs	
1975	Dit Clapper	Ice hockey	Athlete	First man to play 20 straight National Hockey League seasons	
2016	Pinball Clemons	Football	Athlete	3-time Grey Cup champion (1991, 1996, 1997) with the Toronto Argonauts; 2-time Canadian Football League all-star; first black head coach to win a Grey Cup (2004)	
1984	Leslie Cliff	Swimming	Athlete	33 national swim titles; Olympic silver medallist	
1970	Betsy Clifford	Alpine Skiing	Athlete	Youngest world championship giant slalom winner ever; youngest Canadian Olympic skier ever	
1956	Cyril Coaffee	Athletics	Athlete	Set world and Canadian record in 100-yard dash (1922); Canadian team captain at 1924 Summer Olympics	
2015	Paul Coffey	Ice hockey	Athlete	4-time Stanley Cup champion (1984, 1985, 1987, 1991) with the Edmonton Oilers and Pittsburgh Penguins	
1985	Jim Coleman	Sport Journalist	Builder	First sports journalist ever to have a nationally syndicated column in Canada; successful author	
1975	Charlie Conacher	Ice hockey	Athlete	1932 Stanley Cup champion with the Toronto Maple Leafs; NHL scoring title (1931–1935)	
1955	Lionel Conacher	Multisport	Athlete	1920 Canadian Light Heavyweight boxing champion; 1921 Grey Cup champion with the Toronto Argonauts; 2-time Stanley Cup champion (1934, 1935) with the Chicago Blackhawks and the Montreal Maroons; Inducted into Canadian Lacrosse Hall of Fame (1965); also prominent in rugby, baseball	
1975	Bill Cook	Ice hockey	Athlete	3-time Western Canada Hockey League scoring champion (1922–26); 2-time Stanley Cup champion (1928, 1933) with the New York Rangers	
1955	Myrtle Cook	Athletics	Athlete	A member of the 'Matchless Six', Canada's first women's Olympic track team. Won the gold medal for the 4 × 100 m relay in the 1928 Amsterdam Olympics.	
2013	Murray Costello	Ice hockey	Builder	President of the Canadian Amateur Hockey Association (now Hockey Canada); Vice-president of the International Ice Hockey Federation	
1956	Gerard Cote	Athletics	Athlete	4-time winner of the Boston Marathon (1940, 1942, 1943, 1948)	
1955	Johnny Coulon	Boxing	Athlete	1910 World Bantamweight Champion	
1967	Gary Cowan	Golf	Athlete	Named best Canadian male golfer of the century	
1975	Ernie Cox	Football	Athlete	3-time Grey Cup champion (1928, 1929, 1932) with the Hamilton Tiger Cats	
1971	Eric Coy	Athletics	Athlete	Captain of the Canadian track and field team at the 1948 Olympics; 1938 Canadian champion of javelin and shot put	
1975	Ross Craig	Football	Athlete	1913 Grey Cup champion with the Hamilton Tigers	
1977	Toller Cranston	Figure skating	Athlete	Record 6-time Canadian Championship winner; 1976 Olympic bronze medallist	
2018	Chandra Crawford	Cross Country skiing	Athlete	2006 Olympic gold medallist; 4-time World Cup medallist (2006 bronze, 2008 gold x2, 2011 silver)	
2015	James Creighton	Ice hockey	Builder	Helped organize and played in the first recorded indoor game of ice hockey	
1977	Dennis Croke	Rowing	Athlete	Member of the Outer Cove Rowing Crew, winners of the Fisherman's Race in 1901 in a record time of 9 minutes and 13 seconds	
1971	Bill Crothers	Athletics	Athlete	1964 Olympic silver medallist; 2-time Commonwealth Games silver medallist (1966)	
2015	Norton Crow	Multisport	Builder	Strong advocate for new facilities, the expansion of physical education in schools, training for coaches, subsidization of amateur sport organizations, and the development of a "Canadian Olympics" where amateur championships would be held every four years.	
1975	Wes Cutler	Football	Athlete	3-time Grey Cup champion (1933, 1937, 1938) with the Toronto Argonauts	
1955	Louis Cyr	Weightlifting	Athlete	1886 Canadian Strongman champion; Reported to have lifted a world record 4,337 pounds on his back (1895)	
1955	Frances Dafoe	Figure skating	Athlete	Won World Championships in 1954 and 1955 with partner Norris Bowden – the first Canadians to win a world pairs figure skating title; 1956 Cortina d'Ampezzo Olympics silver medallist	
1978	Jack Davies	Multisport	Builder	Helped develop the Commonwealth Games	
1990	Victor Davis	Swimming	Athlete	4-time Olympic medallist (1984 gold and 2 silvers, 1988 silver); 2-time World Championship gold medallist in the 100m	
2015	Sidney Dawes	Skiing	Builder	President of the Canadian Olympic Association; Helped establish Whistler Mountain as an internationally recognized skiing venue	
1968	Jim Day	Equestrian	Athlete	Won gold in team show jumping at the 1968 Olympics as Canada's first entry into the event	
2015	Alex Decoteau	Athletics	Athlete	Canada's first indigenous police officer; Accomplished amateur runner	
1975	John DeGruchy	Football	Athlete	President of the Canadian Rugby Union; helped develop 6-man football	
1973	Victor Delamarre	Weightlifting	Athlete	Showcased feats of strength; lifted world record 309.5 lbs; lifted 201 lbs with one finger; fought in more than 1500 pro wrestling bouts	
1955	Jack Delaney	Boxing	Athlete	World Light-Heavyweight Champion (1926); fought in Madison Square Garden's opening bout (1925)	
1975	Jack Dennett	Sport Broadcaster	Builder	Had largest audience of listeners in Canada; Chairman of Canada's Sports Hall of Fame Selection Committee	
2022	Dwayne de Rosario	Soccer	Athlete	4-time MLS Champion (2001, 2003, 2006, 2007); 2-time MLS MVP (2001, 2007); Top 10 MLS all-time leading goalscorer	
1955	Etienne Desmarteau	Athletics	Athlete	Won Canada's first-ever gold medal at the 1904 St. Louis Olympics in weight toss	
2018	Alexandre Despatie	Diving	Athlete	37-time Canadian Champion; 8-time World Champion; First Canadian male diver to win an Olympic medal (2004 silver, 2008 silver)	
1971	Phyllis Dewar	Swimming	Athlete	Set new records in each of the 100-yard, 400-yard, 1,000-yard, 1,500-yard freestyle events and set a record for the mile of 23 minutes and 32 seconds (1935)	
1981	Glen Dexter	Sailing	Athlete	Member of the youngest sailing crew at the 1976 Montreal Olympics; 2-time World Soling Champion	
1957	Walter D'Hondt	Rowing	Athlete	2-time Olympic medallist (1956 gold, 1960 silver); part of the team that won Canada's first gold medal for rowing	
1997	Marcel Dionne	Ice hockey	Athlete	Member of the 1972 Summit Series Team; 2-time NHL Most Outstanding Player	
1955	George Dixon	Boxing	Athlete	World Bantamweight Champion and first black world champion (1888); World Featherweight Champion (1891); invented shadowboxing	
2016	Stéphanie Dixon	Para swimming	Athlete	19-time Paralympic medallist at 3 Paralympic Games (7 gold, 10 silver, 2 bronze)	
1995	Paul Dojack	Football	Builder	Refereed 550 CFL games including 14 Grey Cups	
2004	Jack Donohue	Basketball	Builder	Coached the Canadian Men's National team for 17 years, the longest coaching tenure in amateur or professional Canadian sports	
2008	David Dore	Figure skating	Builder	Officiated at 7 World Championships and the 1984 Olympic Games; Director General of Skate Canada	
1989	Clare Drake	Ice hockey	Builder	First Canadian University hockey coach to record 500 wins with the University of Alberta Golden Bears	
1978	Jerome Drayton	Athletics	Athlete	12-time national champion; 13-time record setter; 1st place at the Boston Marathon (1977); 2-time Fukuoka Marathon winner (1969, 1975)	
1989	Gordie Drillon	Ice hockey	Athlete	1942 Stanley Cup champion with the Toronto Maple Leafs	
1984	Ken Dryden	Ice hockey	Athlete	6-time Stanley Cup champion with the Montreal Canadiens (1971, 1973, 1976, 1977, 1978, 1979); 5-time Vezina Trophy winner; 1971 Conn Smythe Trophy winner; 1972 Calder Memorial Trophy winner	
1962	George Duggan	Sailing	Athlete	Designed and built 142 boats for small-class yacht competition; Founded the Toronto Yacht Club	
1991	Don Duguid	Curling	Athlete	3-time Brier champion (1965, 1970, 1971); 2-time World Curling Champion (1970, 1971)	
1991	Milt Dunnell	Sport Broadcaster	Builder	Covered Winter and Summer Olympic Games from 1952 to 1968; considered the "Dean of Canadian Sportswriters"	
1975	Yvon Durelle	Boxing	Athlete	2-time Canadian Light-Heavyweight Champion (1953, 1954); 1957 British Empire Light-Heavyweight Champion	
1986	Bill Durnan	Ice hockey	Athlete	2-time Stanley Cup champion with the Montreal Canadiens (1944, 1946); 6-time Vezina Trophy winner	
2015	Carol Ann Duthie	Water Skiing	Athlete	Pioneer in water skiing; won bronze at the second-ever World Water Skiing Championships (1953); won the national title in 1954	
1969	George Duthie	Multisport	Builder	Manager of Sports Department for the Canadian National Exhibition from 1933 to 1968; oversaw development of long-distance swimming, water skiing, basketball, boxing, wrestling, football, hockey, motorboat racing, and track and field.	
2015	Cam Ecclestone	Baseball	Athlete	Considered Canada's best fastball player of the first half of the 20th century	
2015	Michael Edgson	Para Swimming	Athlete	18-time Paralympic gold medallist (1984, 1988, 1992); most accomplished Paralympic athlete in Canadian history	
2017	Edmonton Grads: Helen Northup Alexander; Betty Ross Bellamy; Betty Bawden Bowen; Evelyn Coulson Cameron; Doris Neale Chapman; Helen McIntosh Davidson; Mary Dunn Dickson; Gladys Fry Douglas; Sophie Brown Drake; Hariett "Hattie" Hopkins; Margaret Kinney Howes; Margurite Bailey Jacobs; Daisy Johnson; Abbie Scott Kennedy; Muriel "Babe" Daniel Loughlin; Kay Macritchie Macbeth; Noella "Babe" Belanger Maclean; Jesse Innes Maloney; Mabel Munton Mccloy; Joan Johnston Mcewen; Nellie Perry Mcintosh; Connie Smith Mcintyre; Frances Gordon Mills; Elizabeth Elrick Murray; Jean Williamson Quilley; Winnie Gallen Reid; Noel Macdonald Robertson; Elsie Bennie Robson; Dot Johnson Sherlock; Kate Macrae Shore; Etta Dann Soderberg; Helen Stone Stewart; Edith Stone Sutton; Winnie Martin Tait; Margaret Macburney Vasheresse; Eleanor Mountifield Vogelsong; Mae Brown Webb; Mildred Mccormack Wilkie	Basketball	Athletes	Ruled women's basketball from 1915 to 1940, winning an average of 95% of their matches. Only seven teams were able to score 50 or more points against them in a single game, and they never lost a series in the Underwood International Championships, winning 23 times. Called "the finest basketball team that ever stepped out on a floor" by Dr. James Naismith	
1997	Phil Edwards	Athletics	Athlete	5-time Olympic bronze medallist (1928, 1932, 1936); first recipient of the Northern Star Award (1936); Lionel Conacher Award winner (1936)	
2015	Jan Eisenhardt	Multisport	Builder	Helped create the National Physical Fitness Act	
1996	Lloyd Eisler	Figure skating	Athlete	2-time Olympic bronze medallist (1992, 1994); 1993 World Champion; 3-time World Championship silver medallist (1990, 1991, 1994) with partner Isabelle Brasseur	
1968	Jim Elder	Equestrian	Athlete	Won gold in team show jumping at the 1968 Olympics as Canada's first entry into the event	
1975	Eddie Emerson	Football	Athlete	2-time Grey Cup Champion with the Ottawa Rough Riders; played 22 seasons, a Canadian football record at the time; president of the Ottawa Rough Riders	
1964	John Emery	Bobsleigh	Athlete	Member of the gold medal-winning Canadian bobsleigh team at the 1964 Innsbruck Olympics	
1964	Vic Emery	Bobsleigh	Athlete	Member of the gold medal-winning Canadian bobsleigh team at the 1964 Innsbruck Olympics; Won gold again the next year at the 1965 World Championships	
1991	Johnny Esaw	Sport Broadcaster	Builder	Sports broadcasting pioneer; helped grow the popularity of figure skating; produced the first colour telecast of a hockey game (1967)	
1989	Phil Esposito	Ice hockey	Athlete	2-time Stanley Cup champion with the Boston Bruins (1970, 1972); 5-time Art Ross Trophy winner (1969, 1971–1974); Member of the 1972 Summit Series Team	
1958	Walter Ewing	Shooting	Athlete	Won gold in shooting at the 1908 Olympics	
2008	1996 Summer Olympics 4 × 100 m track & field relay team: Donovan Bailey; Robert Esmie; Glenroy Gilbert; Bruny Surin; Carlton Chambers	Athletics	Athletes	2-time World Championship gold medallists (1995, 1997); Gold medallists in the 4 × 100 m relay race at the 1996 Summer Olympics	
1964	Edouard Fabre	Athletics	Athlete	Decorated marathon runner; Competed in over 315 races and won hundreds of medals and trophies	
1999	Bernie Faloney	Football	Athlete	3-time Grey Cup champion with Edmonton (1954) and the Hamilton Tiger Cats (1957, 1963); 1961 CFL Most Outstanding Player;	
1975	Cap Fear	Football	Athlete	3-time Grey Cup champion with the Toronto Argonauts (1921) and the Hamilton Tigers (1928, 1929); Runner-up, North American welterweight boxing title; Played senior hockey; Champion rower	
2023	Team Ferbey: Randy Ferbey; David Nedohin; Scott Pfeifer; Marcel Rocque	Curling	Athletes	3-time world champions; 4-time Brier champions	
1968	Elmer Ferguson	Sport Journalist	Builder	Sports journalism pioneer	
1969	Hervé Filion	Horse Racing	Athlete	Won 15,017 races and more than $86 million in prize money	
1979	Howard Firby	Swimming	Builder	Founding coach of the Vancouver Dolphins Swim Club, 6-time Canadian team title winners; Coached Canadian swimmers at 1958 British Empire Games, 1964 Olympic Games, 1966 Commonwealth Games	
2015	Sharon Firth	Cross Country Skiing	Athlete	Among the first Indigenous athletes to represent Canada at the Olympics; Competed for Canada's first-ever Olympic women's cross-country ski team	
2015	Shirley Firth	Cross Country Skiing	Athlete	Among the first Indigenous athletes to represent Canada at the Olympics; Competed for Canada's first-ever Olympic women's cross-country ski team	
2000	Hugh Fisher	Canoe / Kayak Sprint	Athlete	2-time Olympic medallist (1984 gold and bronze); 2-time World Championship medallist (1982 silver, 1983 bronze) with Alwyn Morris	
1961	Billy Fitzgerald	Lacrosse	Athlete	Early 1900s professional lacrosse star; Became one of the highest paid athletes in professional team sport in 1911 by the Vancouver Lacrosse Club	
1975	Pat Fletcher	Golf	Athlete	1954 Canadian Open champion; 1952 Canadian PGA champion; 3-time Saskatchewan Open champion (1947, 1948, 1951)	
2007	Doug Flutie	Football	Athlete	3-time Grey Cup Champion and MVP with the Calgary Stampeders (1992) and the Toronto Argonauts (1996, 1997); 1984 Heisman Trophy winner; 6-time CFL Most Outstanding Player; Ranked greatest CFL player ever (2006)	
1985	Hans Fogh	Sailing	Athlete	2-time Olympic medallist (1960 silver representing Denmark, 1984 bronze representing Canada); 3-time World Cup, 8-time North American, 6-time European, and 4-time Canadian champion in various classes of boats	
1977	Sylvie Fortier	Synchronized Swimming	Athlete	1976 World champion; 24 gold, 4 silver, 2 bronze medals at national level	
2015	Craig Forrest	Soccer	Athlete	2000 Gold Cup champion; First Canadian to play in the English Premier League	
1984	Red Foster	Multisport	Builder	First outdoor hydroplane outboard race in Canada winner (1928); 1930 Grey Cup champion with the Balmy Beach Football Club; Gave the first Canadian play-by-play broadcasts of wrestling, rowing, lacrosse, track and field, and football; Helped bring Special Olympics to Canada	
1981	Terry Fox	N/A	Honorary Member	Embarked on the Marathon of Hope, running 5,342 km in 143 days and raising $23.5m for cancer research	
1999	Sylvie Fréchette	Synchronized Swimming	Athlete	2-time Olympic medallist (1992 silver later overturned to gold, 1996 silver); 1991 World Aquatic Championships solo gold medallist with a record score of 201.013	
2014	Tim Frick	Wheelchair Basketball	Builder	Head coach, Canadian Women's Wheelchair Basketball Team (1986–2009); Led Canada to a decade-long undefeated streak in major international competition; 3 consecutive Paralympic gold medals (1992, 1996, 2000); 4 consecutive World Championship gold medals (1994, 1998, 2002, 2006)	
2004	Lori Fung	Rhythmic Gymnastics	Athlete	1984 Olympic gold medallist; 7-time national rhythmic gymnastics champion	
1985	Tony Gabriel	Football	Athlete	2-time Grey Cup champion with the Hamilton Tiger Cats (1972) and the Ottawa Rough Riders (1976); 1978 CFL Most Outstanding Player; 4-time CFL Most Outstanding Canadian (1974, 1976–1978)	
1995	Bob Gainey	Ice hockey	Athlete	5-time Stanley Cup champion with the Montreal Canadiens (1976–1979, 1986); 4-time and inaugural winner of the Frank Selke Trophy (1977–1981); 1979 Conn Smythe Trophy winner	
2008	Marc Gagnon	Speed Skating	Athlete	5-time Olympic medallist (1994 bronze, 1998 gold, 2002 gold 2x, bronze); 4-time World Championship gold medallist (1993, 1994, 1996, 1998)	
2015	Larry Gains	Boxing	Athlete	Canadian heavyweight champion; Black boxing pioneer	
1980	Sheldon Galbraith	Figure skating	Builder	Coached Canadian figure skaters at 3 Olympic Games (1948, 1956, 1960); Prominent pupils include Barbara Ann Scott, Francis Dafoe and Norris Bowden, Donald Jackson, Barbara Wagner and Robert Paul	
1975	Hugh Gall	Football	Athlete	3-time and inaugural Grey Cup champion with the University of Toronto Blues (1909–1911)	
1989	Danny Gallivan	Sport Broadcaster	Builder	Hosted Hockey Night in Canada for 32 years (1952–1984)	
2008	Nancy Garapick	Swimming	Athlete	2-time Olympic bronze medallist at age 14 (1976); Set a world record in the 200m backstroke at age 13; 5-time Pan-American Games medallist (1979)	
1975	Charlie Gardiner	Ice hockey	Athlete	1934 Stanley Cup champion with the Chicago Black Hawks; 2-time Vezina Trophy winner (1932, 1934)	
1983	George Gate	Swimming	Builder	Coached Canadian Swim Team at the 1963 Pan-American Games, 1968 Olympics, 1973 World Championships; Prominent pupils include Richard Pound, Ralph Hutton	
1990	Jake Gaudaur	Football	Builder	CFL Commissioner (1968–1984); Helped CFL revenue increase six-fold and attendance double; Helped found the Canadian Football Hall of Fame and Museum; Canada's Sports Hall of Fame Governor and chairman of the board	
1956	Jacob Gaudaur	Rowing	Athlete	2-time World Singles Championship winner (1896, 1898), declared best oarsman on Earth; 1892 World Double Sculls champion	
2020–21	Sonja Gaudet	Wheelchair Curling	Athlete	3-time Paralympic gold medallist (2006, 2010, 2014); 3-time World Wheelchair Curling Championship gold medallist (2009, 2011, 2013); First wheelchair curler to be inducted into the Canadian Curling Hall of Fame	
1968	Tom Gayford	Equestrian	Athlete	Won gold in team show jumping at the 1968 Olympics as Canada's first entry into the event	
1955	George Genereux	Trap Shooting	Athlete	1952 Olympic gold medallist; 1952 World Championship silver medallist; 1952 Northern Star Award winner	
1994	Bernie Geoffrion	Ice hockey	Athlete	Credited with inventing and popularizing the slapshot; 6-time Stanley Cup champion with the Montreal Canadiens (1953, 1956–1960); 2-time Art Ross Trophy winner (1955, 1961); 1961 Hart Trophy winner	
1975	Eddie Gerard	Ice hockey	Athlete	3-time Stanley Cup champion as player with the Ottawa Senators (1919–1921, 1923); 1926 Stanley Cup champion as coach of the Montreal Maroons	
2015	Alexandrine Gibb	Multisport	Builder	Women's sport pioneer and advocate for women's sports organizations across Canada in the 1920s and 30s	
1958	George "Mooney" Gibson	Baseball	Athlete	1909 World Series champion with the Pittsburgh Pirates; Voted Canada's Baseball player of the Half Century in 1950	
2015	Nicolas Gill	Judo	Athlete	2-time Olympic medallist (1992 bronze, 2000 silver)	
2008	Pat Gillick	Baseball	Builder	2-time World Series champion (1992, 1993) and 5-time division title winner (1985, 1989, 1991–1993) as Senior Vice President and General Manager of the Toronto Blue Jays	
1975	Tony Golab	Football	Athlete	1940 Grey Cup champion with the Ottawa Rough Riders; Led the Rough Riders to 3 consecutive Grey Cup finals	
2015	Bob Goldham	Ice hockey	Athlete	5-time Stanley Cup champion with the Toronto Maple Leafs (1942, 1947) and the Detroit Red Wings (1952, 1954, 1955)	
1990	Avelino Gomez	Jockey Racing	Athlete	6-time Canadian top race winning jockey between 1956 and 1966; Won over 4,000 races in his career; 1966 Top jockey in North America	
1955	Charles Gorman	Speed Skating	Athlete	1926 World Speed Skating champion; 3-time Canadian outdoor champion (1924–1926); 3-time Canadian indoor champion (1926–1928)	
1955	George Goulding	Athletics	Athlete	1912 Olympic gold medallist in racewalking; Won 18 of 19 major walking competitions in 1909; Broke the mile racewalking world record with a time of 6:25.8	
2002	Geoff Gowan	Athletics	Builder	Technical Director and President of the Coaching Association of Canada (1972–1996)	
2015	Danielle Goyette	Ice hockey	Athlete	3-time Olympic medallist (1998 silver, 2002 gold, 2006 gold); 8-time Women's World Hockey Championship winner	
1993	Laurie Graham	Alpine Skiing	Athlete	6-time World Cup race winner (1984–1987); 3-time Olympian (1980, 1984, 1988);	
2015	Gerald Gratton	Weightlifting	Athlete	1952 Olympic silver medallist; 2-time British Empire Games gold medallist (1950, 1954)	
1973	George Gray	Athletics	Athlete	Held the world shot put title for 17 years (1885–1902)	
1967	Nancy Greene	Alpine Skiing	Athlete	1967 World Cup champion; 2-time Olympic medallist (1968 gold, silver); 17-time national champion; 3-time Olympian (1960, 1964, 1968)	
2015	Cecil Grenier	Multisport	Builder	Helped establish modern female physical education	
1992	Jean Grenier	Speed Skating	Builder	Founding president of the Quebec Speed Skating Federation; President of the Canadian Speedskating association (1976–1977)	
2000	Wayne Gretzky	Ice hockey	Athlete	4-time Stanley Cup Champion (1984, 1985, 1987, 1988); NHL all-time points leader; 8-time NHL MVP; Widely considered the greatest ice hockey player of all time	
1975	Harry Griffith	Football	Builder	2-time and inaugural Grey Cup champion as coach of the University of Toronto (1909, 1910)	
2015	Phyllis Griffiths	Sport Journalist	Builder	Had her own sports column at the Toronto Telegram dedicated to women's sports for 14 years (1928–1942); First woman to be the photo editor of a Canadian newspaper	
2005	George Gross	Sport Journalist	Builder	Covered various international sporting events including the World Hockey Championships, the FIFA World Cup, the Olympic Games, Wimbledon	
2025	Erik Guay	Alpine skiing	Athlete	Two-time world champion (2011, 2017)	
1955	Jack Guest	Rowing	Athlete		
1955	Horace Gwynne	Boxing	Athlete	1932 Olympic gold medallist; Retired as the undefeated Canadian Professional Bantamweight champion (1938–1939)	
1993	Glenn Hall	Ice hockey	Athlete	1961 Stanley Cup champion with the Chicago Blackhawks; Played an NHL record 502 consecutive games; 2-time Vezina Trophy winner (1963, 1967)	
1975	Sydney Halter	Football	Builder	First commissioner of the Canadian Football League	
1972	Jack Hamilton	Ice hockey	Builder	Former president of the Saskatchewan and Canadian Amateur Hockey Associations	
1955	Ned Hanlan	Rowing	Athlete	World single-sculls rowing champion (1880–1884), defending the title 6 times; 1876 Centennial Regatta champion	
2006	Rick Hansen	Wheelchair Athletics	Athlete	Embarked on the Man in Motion Tour in 1985, wheeling 40,072 km through 34 countries over 792 days and raising $26.1m for spinal cord injury research	
1987	Fritz Hanson	Football	Athlete	4-time Grey Cup champion with Winnipeg (1935, 1938, 1941) and the Calgary Stampeders (1948); Inaugural inductee to the Canadian Football Hall of Fame	
2005	Curt Harnett	Cycling Track	Athlete	3-time Olympic medallist (1984 silver, 1992 bronze, 1996 bronze)	
1980	Barney Hartman	Skeet Shooting	Athlete	Held nearly 30 world records in 12, 20, 28, and .410 gauge shooting; All-around world champion (1968–1971)	
1975	Doug Harvey	Ice hockey	Athlete	6-time Stanley Cup champion with the Montreal Canadiens (1953, 1956–1960); 7-time Norris Trophy winner, (1954–1958, 1960, 1961 with the Canadiens, 1962 while coaching the New York Rangers)	
2014	Pierre Harvey	Cross Country Skiing	Athlete	3-time Olympian (1984, 1988), competed in both the 1984 Winter (cross-country skiing) and Summer (cycling) Olympic Games; First Canadian to win an international cross-country skiing event (1987)	
1998	Sandy Hawley	Jockey Racing	Athlete	Won more than 6000 races in his career; First rider to win 500 races in a year (1973)	
2016	Frank Hayden	Special Olympics	Builder	Created the Special Olympics	
1960	Bob Hayward	Speed Boat	Athlete	Mechanic, crew member, and driver of Miss Supertest II and III; Harmsworth Trophy winner (1959–1961)	
2014	Geraldine Heaney	Ice hockey	Athlete	2-time Olympic medallist (1998 silver, 2002 gold); 7-time World Championship gold medallist (1990, 1992, 1994, 1997, 1999–2001)	
1997	Kathleen Heddle	Rowing	Athlete	Partner of Marnie McBean; 3-time Olympic gold medallists (1992 2x, 1996), 1996 Olympic bronze medallists; First Canadians to win 3 Summer Olympic gold medals; Canada's most successful Olympians at the time of their retirement	
2019	Jayna Hefford	Ice hockey	Athlete	4-time Olympic gold medallist (2002, 2006, 2010, 2014), 1998 Olympic silver medallist; 7-time gold and 5-time silver medallist at the World Championships	
1960	Anne Heggtveit	Alpine Skiing	Athlete	1960 Olympic gold medallist, Canada's first skiing gold medal; 1960 slalom and combined alpine world champion	
2015	Frederick James Heather	Cricket	Builder	Umpired in more than 1000 consecutive matches (1927–1967); Instrumental in founding cricket associations and leagues in Canada	
2015	Jennifer Heil	Freestyle Skiing	Athlete	2-time Olympic medallist (2006 gold, 2010 silver); 8-time world champion	
1995	Paul Henderson	Ice hockey	Athlete	Scored 3 game-winning goals at the 1972 Summit Series, including the series-winning goal	
1955	Doug Hepburn	Weightlifting	Athlete	1953 world heavyweight champion; 1949 U.S. National Open champion; 1954 British Empire Games gold medallist	
1975	Foster Hewitt	Sport Broadcaster	Builder	Broadcast first ever hockey game live via radio (1923); Called first live television broadcast of a hockey game in Canada (1952); Coined the term "He shoots, he scores!"	
2015	Robina Higgins	Athletics	Athlete	9-time national champion in javelin, shot put, discus, and ball throw competitions; Held Canadian records in javelin and ball throw	
1985	Ike Hildebrand	Lacrosse	Athlete	5-time Mann Cup champion (1943 with the New Westminster Salmonbellies, 1951–1954 with the Peterborough Timbermen)	
1999	John Hiller	Baseball	Athlete	1968 World Series champion with the Detroit Tigers; 1973 American League Fireman of the Year	
1955	George Hodgson	Swimming	Athlete	2-time Olympic gold medallist (1912); Set the world record in the 400m, 1000m, and 1500m swim	
2004	Abby Hoffman	Athletics	Athlete	4-time Olympian; 5-time Pan American Games medallist; 1966 Commonwealth Games gold medallist; 1976 Montreal Olympic Games flag bearer; Director General of Sport Canada	
2016	Sue Holloway	Canoe / Kayak Sprint	Athlete	First woman to compete at both the Winter and Summer Olympic Games	
2012	Charmaine Hooper	Soccer	Athlete	Member of Canada's first ever national women's team; 3 FIFA World Cup appearances with Canada	
2019	Waneek Horn-Miller	Water Polo	Athlete	1999 Pan American Games gold medallist and MVP; 1999 Tom Longboat Award winner; 20-time medallist in multiple events at the North American Indigenous Games; Co-captain of Team Canada at the 2000 Olympic Games	
2002	Tim Horton	Ice hockey	Athlete	4-time Stanley Cup champion with the Toronto Maple Leafs; 7-time NHL All-Star; Opened the first Tim Hortons restaurant, eventually expanding across Canada	
2015	Barbara Howard	Athletics	Athlete		
1972	Kid Howard	Boxing	Athlete		
2013	Russ Howard	Curling	Athlete		
1975	Gordie Howe	Ice hockey	Athlete		
2010	Clara Hughes	Cycling – Road & Speedskating	Athlete		
1988	Bobby Hull	Ice hockey	Athlete		
1964	George Hungerford	Rowing	Athlete	Won Olympic gold medal with Roger Jackson at the 1964 Tokyo Olympics	
2001	Bill Hunter	Ice hockey	Athlete		
1978	Jules Huot	Golf	Athlete		
1977	Ralph Hutton	Swimming	Athlete		
2017	Carol Huynh	Wrestling	Athlete		
2007	Daniel Igali	Wrestling	Athlete		
1975	Dick Irvin	Ice hockey	Builder		
2015	Bill Isaacs	Lacrosse	Athlete		
1975	Bob Isbister	Football	Athlete		
2007	Sam Jacks	Ringette	Builder	Invented early Canadian variant of floor hockey, coached in the AAU Junior Olympic Games, World War II soldier, YMCA Director in Toronto, President and creator of the Society of Directors of Municipal Recreation of Ontario (SDMRO), created the sport of ringette, inducted into the Ringette Canada Hall of Fame	SPHoF
1962	Donald Jackson	Figure skating	Athlete		
1975	Busher Jackson	Ice hockey	Athlete		
2017	Robert W. Jackson	Paralympic Games	Builder		
1964 & 2010	Roger Jackson	Rowing	Athlete & Builder	Inducted as athlete in 1964 for winning an Olympic gold medal with George Hungerford at the 1964 Tokyo Olympics Inducted as builder in 2010 for service as Sport Canada director; Canadian Olympic Association president; consultant on six Olympic bids	
1975	Russ Jackson	Football	Athlete		
2009	Angela James	Ice hockey	Athlete		
1975	Eddie James	Football	Athlete		
1962	Maria Jelinek	Figure skating	Athlete		
1962	Otto Jelinek	Figure skating	Athlete		
1987	Ferguson Jenkins	Baseball	Athlete		
1971	Harry Jerome	Athletics	Athlete		
1975	Aurel Joliat	Ice hockey	Athlete		
2016	Colleen Jones	Curling	Athlete	Skipped her Halifax rink to 6 Canadian women's championships	
1981	Andreas Josenhans	Sailing	Athlete	Member of the youngest sailing crew at the 1976 Montreal Olympics; 2-time World Soling Champion	
1981	Gordon Juckes	Ice hockey	Builder		
2020–21	Lorie Kane	Golf	Athlete		
2015	Joe Keeper	Athletics	Athlete		
2019	Vicki Keith	Swimming	Athlete		
1975	Red Kelly	Ice hockey	Athlete		
2018	Dave Keon	Ice hockey	Athlete		
2020–21	Sheldon Kennedy	Ice hockey	Builder		
2020–21	Judy Kent	Sport Administration	Builder		
1955	Bobby Kerr	Track Events	Athlete		
1968	Bruce Kidd	Athletics	Athlete		
1964	Peter Kirby	Bobsleigh	Athlete	Member of the gold medal-winning Canadian bobsleigh team at the 1964 Innsbruck Olympics; Won gold again the next year at the 1965 World Championships	
2018	Sandra Kirby	Sport Administration	Builder		
2017	Cindy Klassen	Speed Skating	Athlete		
1955	Walter Knox	Athletics	Athlete		
1969	George Knudson	Golf	Athlete		
2020–21	Diane Jones Konihowski	Athletics	Athlete		
1976	Kathy Kreiner	Alpine Skiing	Athlete		
1975	Joe Krol	Football	Athlete		
1990	Joe Kryczka	Ice hockey	Builder		
1975	Norman Kwong	Football	Athlete		
1996	Guy Lafleur	Ice hockey	Athlete		
1965	Patrick Lally	Lacrosse	Builder		
1955	Newsy Lalonde	Ice hockey	Athlete		
2020–21	Eric Lamaze & Hickstead	Equestrian – Show Jumping	Team		
2002	Nathalie Lambert	Short Track Speed Skating	Athlete		
1985	Ron Lancaster	Football	Athlete		
1955	Sam Langford	Boxing	Athlete		
1998	Silken Laumann	Rowing	Athlete		
1960	Jack Laviolette	Lacrosse	Athlete		
1975	Smirle Lawson	Football	Athlete		
2012	Marion Lay	Swimming	Builder		
1975	Frank Leadley	Football	Athlete		
1994	René Lecavalier	Sport Broadcaster	Builder		
1995	Kerrin Lee-Gartner	Alpine Skiing	Athlete		
2005	Catriona Le May Doan	Speed Skating	Athlete		
1998	Mario Lemieux	Ice hockey	Athlete		
2022	Edward Lennie	Traditional Arctic Sports	Builder		
1964	Stan Leonard	Golf	Athlete		
1977	Lucille Lessard	Archery	Athlete		
1986	Jean-Louis Lévesque	Horse Racing	Builder		
2008	Lennox Lewis	Boxing	Athlete		
1977	Dorothy Lidstone	Archery	Athlete		
2002	Ted Lindsay	Ice hockey	Athlete		
2018	Wilton Littlechild	Indigenous Peoples' Sports	Builder		
2015	Johnny Loaring	Athletics	Athlete		
1988	Don Loney	Football	Builder		
1955	Tom Longboat	Athletics	Athlete		
1958	Johnny Longden	Jockey Racing	Athlete		
1957	Lorne Loomer	Rowing	Athlete		
1985	Jocelyn Lovell	Cycling Track	Athlete		
2012	Pierre Lueders	Bobsleigh	Athlete		
1985	Sammy Luftspring	Boxing	Athlete		
1976	Cliff Lumsdon	Swimming	Athlete		
1955	George Lyon	Golf	Athlete		
2023	Oren Lyons	Lacrosse	Builder	Indigenous advocate.	
1981	Irene MacDonald	Diving	Athlete		
1971	Noel MacDonald	Basketball	Athlete		
1976	Hartland MacDougall	Multisport	Athlete		
1955	Ada Mackenzie	Golf	Athlete		
1957	Archie MacKinnon	Rowing	Athlete		
1957	Dan MacKinnon	Horse Racing	Builder		
1981	Sandy MacMillan	Sailing	Athlete	Member of the youngest sailing crew at the 1976 Montreal Olympics; 2-time World Soling Champion	
1973	Karen Magnussen	Figure Skating	Athlete		
1990	Frank Mahovlich	Ice hockey	Athlete		
1975	Joe Malone	Ice hockey	Athlete		
2014	Elizabeth Manley	Figure Skating	Athlete		
2015	Harry Manson	Soccer	Athlete		
1993	George Mara	Multisport	Builder		
1976	Phil Marchildon	Baseball	Athlete		
1962	Wilbert Martel	Bowling	Athlete		
2025	Kevin Martin	Curling	Athlete	Olympic gold medallist (2010) and silver medallist (2002); World champion (2008); Four-time Brier champion (1991, 1997, 2008, 2009)	
1988	Paul Martini	Figure Skating	Athlete		
1971	Charles Mayer	Sport Journalist	Builder		
1997	Marnie McBean	Rowing	Athlete		
1978	Harry McBrien	Football	Builder		
1977	Daniel McCarthy	Rowing	Athlete	Member of the Outer Cove Rowing Crew, winners of the Fisherman's Race in 1901 in a record time of 9 minutes and 13 seconds	
1977	Denis McCarthy	Rowing	Athlete	Member of the Outer Cove Rowing Crew, winners of the Fisherman's Race in 1901 in a record time of 9 minutes and 13 seconds	
1967	Earl McCready	Wrestling	Athlete		
1960	Jack McCulloch	Speed Skating	Athlete		
1959	Frank McGill	Multisport	Athlete		
2022	Tim McIsaac	Paralympic swimming	Athlete		
1963	Jimmy McLarnin	Boxing	Athlete		
1963	Samuel McLaughlin	Horse Racing	Builder		
1963	Duncan McNaughton	Athletics	Athlete		
2017	Lanny McDonald	Ice hockey	Athlete		
2015	Manny McIntyre	Ice hockey	Athlete		
2015	Robert McLeod	Cycling – Road	Athlete		
1963	Donald McPherson	Figure Skating	Athlete		
2015	Aileen Meagher	Athletics	Athlete		
2009	Mark Messier	Ice hockey	Athlete		
1967	Johnny Miles	Athletics	Athlete		
1996	Ian Millar	Equestrian	Athlete		
1960	Miss Supertest III	Speed Boat	Athlete		
1973	Ray Mitchell	Bowling	Athlete		
2019	Doug Mitchell	Multisport	Builder		
1975	Percy Molson	Football	Athlete		
2009	Warren Moon	Football	Athlete		
1955	Howie Morenz	Ice hockey	Athlete		
2000	Alwyn Morris	Canoe / Kayak Sprint	Athlete	2-time Olympic medallist (1984 gold and bronze); 2-time World Championship medallist (1982 silver, 1983 bronze) with Hugh Fisher; 1977 Tom Longboat Award winner	
1975	Teddy Morris	Football	Athlete		
2006	Al Morrow	Rowing	Builder		
2015	Lori-Ann Muenzer	Cycling Track	Athlete	2004 Olympic gold medallist; Only Canadian to ever win Olympic gold in cycling	
1995	Debbie Muir	Synchronized Swimming	Builder		
2015	Albert Murray	Golf	Athlete		
1972	Athol Murray	Ice hockey	Builder		
2015	Charles Murray	Golf	Athlete		
1980	Ken Murray	Multisport	Builder		
1955	James Naismith	Basketball	Builder	Invented basketball	
2023	Hiroshi Nakamura	Judo	Builder	High performance coach.	
1977	Susan Nattrass	Trap Shooting	Athlete		
2020–21	Steve Nash	Basketball	Athlete		
2011	Andrea Neil	Soccer	Athlete		
1993	Cindy Nicholas	Swimming	Athlete		
2012	Scott Niedermayer	Ice hockey	Athlete		
1975	Frank Nighbor	Ice hockey	Athlete		
2025	Ted Nolan	Ice hockey	Builder	Successful NHL coach and advocate for Indigenous youth	
2006	Moe Norman	Golf	Athlete		
1970	Ron Northcott	Curling	Athlete		
1965	Northern Dancer	Horse Racing	Athlete		
1977	John Nugent	Rowing	Athlete	Member of the Outer Cove Rowing Crew, winners of the Fisherman's Race in 1901 in a record time of 9 minutes and 13 seconds	
1980	Andy O'Brien	Sport Journalist	Builder		
1965	Joe O'Brien	Horse Racing	Athlete		
1992	Bill O'Donnell	Horse Racing	Athlete		
1966	John O'Neill	Rowing	Athlete		
1994	Tip O'Neill	Baseball	Athlete		
1982	Bobby Orr	Ice hockey	Athlete		
1991	Brian Orser	Figure Skating	Athlete		
1977	George Orton	Athletics	Athlete		
1994	Anne Ottenbrite	Swimming	Athlete		
1957	Gerry Ouellette	Shooting	Athlete		
2013	Jean-Guy Ouellet	Multisport	Builder		
1955	Percy Page	Basketball	Builder		
1956	Paris Crew: Robert Fulton; Samuel Hutton; George Price; Elijah Ross	Rowing	Athletes		
1987	Jackie Parker	Football	Athlete		
2000	Tom Pashby	Multisport	Builder	Helped the development of helmets, face guards, visors, and other face protection in the NHL	
2011	Lui Passaglia	Football	Athlete		
1975	Frank Patrick	Ice hockey	Builder		
1975	Lester Patrick	Ice hockey	Builder		
1957	Robert Paul	Figure Skating	Athlete		
1975	Bobby Pearce	Rowing	Athlete		
1979	Doug Peden	Multisport	Athlete		
1955	Torchy Peden	Cycling – Road	Athlete		
2023	Danielle Peers	Wheelchair basketball	Athlete	2004 Paralympic bronze medallist; 2006 World Championship gold medallist	
2012	David Pelletier	Figure Skating	Athlete		
1976	Lloyd Percival	Multisport	Builder		
1994	Karen Percy	Alpine Skiing	Athlete		
2016	Annie Perreault	Short Track Speed Skating	Athlete	2-time Olympic gold medallist; 4-time world champion with the Canadian women's 3,000-metre relay team	
1975	Gordon Perry	Football	Athlete		
1975	Norm Perry	Football	Athlete		
2010	Chantal Petitclerc	Para Athletics	Athlete		
2015	Alf Philips	Diving	Athlete		
2015	Bob Pirie	Swimming	Athlete		
1981	Jacques Plante	Ice hockey	Athlete	6-time Stanley Cup champion with the Montreal Canadiens (1953, 1956–1960); first goaltender to consistently wear a face mask; 7-time Vezina Trophy winner (1956–1960, 1962, 1969)	
1987	Steve Podborski	Alpine Skiing	Athlete		
1982	Sam Pollock	Ice hockey	Builder		
1969	Bobby Porter	Multisport	Athlete		
2012	Derek Porter	Rowing	Athlete		
1988	Sandra Post	Golf	Athlete		
2001	Denis Potvin	Ice hockey	Athlete		
2011	Richard Pound	Sport Administration	Builder		
2015	Robert Powell	Tennis	Athlete		
1977	Walter Power	Rowing	Athlete	Member of the Outer Cove Rowing Crew, winners of the Fisherman's Race in 1901 in a record time of 9 minutes and 13 seconds	
2006	Jonathon Power	Squash	Athlete		
2017	Gaylord Powless	Lacrosse	Athlete		
2020–21	Ross Powless	Lacrosse	Builder		
1965	Gerald Presley	Bobsleigh	Athlete	Member of the gold medal-winning Canadian bobsleigh team at the 1965 World Championships	
2022	Preston Rivulettes: Marie Bellstein; Ruth Dargel (Collins); Eleanor Fairgrieves; Margaret Gabbitass (Tipper); Violet Hall; Gladys Marguerite Hawkins (Pitcher); Fay Hilborn; Norma Hipel (Jacques); Sheila Lahey; Winnie Makcrow; Pat Marriott; M. Neath; Myrtle Parr; Dot Raffey; Eleanor 'Nellie' Ranscombe; Hilda Ranscombe; Midge Robertson; Helen Sault (Carter); Helen Schmuck; Marm Schmuck; P. Soehner; Grace 'Toddy' Webb; Elvis Williams	Ice hockey	Trailblazer	The most successful women's ice hockey team in Canadian history	
1970	Harry Price	Multisport	Builder		
1975	Joe Primeau	Ice hockey	Athlete		
1977	John Primrose	Trap Shooting	Athlete		
2015	Harvey Pulford	Multisport	Athlete		
1955	Jack Purcell	Badminton	Athlete		
1975	Silver Quilty	Football	Athlete		
1984	Pat Ramage	Alpine Skiing	Builder		
2015	Scotty Rankine	Athletics	Athlete		
2015	Hilda Ranscombe	Ice hockey	Athlete		
2005	Claude Raymond	Baseball	Athlete		
1976	Harold Rea	Multisport	Builder		
2015	Frank Read	Rowing	Builder		
1986	Ken Read	Alpine Skiing	Athlete		
1984	George Reed	Football	Athlete	Grey Cup champion with the Saskatchewan Roughriders, All-time CFL record for rushing touchdowns, 11-time CFL all star	
2014	Gareth Rees	Rugby	Athlete		
1959	Ted Reeve	Multisport	Athlete		
2011	Peter Reid	Triathlon	Athlete		
1992	Henri Richard	Ice hockey	Athlete		
1975	Maurice Richard	Ice hockey	Athlete		
2015	Eileen Whalley Richards	Speed Skating	Athlete		
1968	Richardson Curling Team: Arnold Richardson; Ernie Richardson; Garnet Richardson; Wes Richardson	Curling	Athletes		
1974	Con Riley	Rowing	Athlete		
1964	Al Ritchie	Football	Builder		
2015	Winnie Roach-Leuszler	Swimming	Athlete		
1977	Bruce Robertson	Swimming	Athlete		
1971	Graydon "Blondie" Robinson	Bowling	Athlete		
2004	Larry Robinson	Ice hockey	Athlete		
2015	Melville Marks Robinson	Athletics	Builder		
1971	Fred Robson	Speed Skating	Athlete		
1977	Doug Rogers	Judo	Athlete		
1973	Shotty Rogers	Rowing	Builder		
1955	Bobbie Rosenfeld	Track Events	Athlete	A member of the 'Matchless Six', Canada's first women's Olympic track team. Won the gold medal for the 4 × 100 m relay in the 1928 Amsterdam Olympics.	
1975	Art Ross	Ice hockey	Builder		
1955	William James Roué	Yachting	Builder		
1975	Paul Rowe	Football	Athlete		
2013	1992 Olympics – Women's rowing Team Coxless Four: Kirsten Barnes; Brenda Taylor; Jessica Monroe; Kay Worthington; Jennifer Walinga	Rowing	Athletes		
2010	Patrick Roy	Ice hockey	Athlete		
1955	Louis Rubenstein	Figure Skating	Athlete		
1975	Jeff Russell	Football	Athlete		
1975	Joe Ryan	Football	Builder		
1971	Thomas F. Ryan	Bowling	Builder		
1963	Gus Ryder	Swimming	Builder		
1956	Emile St. Godard	Dogsled Racing	Athlete		
2012	Jamie Salé	Figure Skating	Athlete		
2013	Joe Sakic	Ice hockey	Athlete		
1982	Claude Saunders	Rowing	Builder		
2006	Julie Sauvé	Synchronized Swimming	Builder		
1975	Terry Sawchuk	Ice hockey	Athlete		
1975	Milt Schmidt	Ice hockey	Athlete		
2000	Schmirler Curling Team: Jan Betker; Marcia Gudereit; Joan McCusker; Sandra Schmirler	Curling	Athletes	1998 Olympic gold medallists; 3-time World Champions; 3-time Canadian champions	
1975	Bert Schneider	Boxing	Athlete		
1955	Lewis Scholes	Rowing	Athlete		
1955	Barbara Ann Scott	Figure Skating	Athlete		
2007	Beckie Scott	Cross Country Skiing	Athlete		
2012	Doc Seaman	Ice hockey	Builder		
1993	Bob Secord	Multisport	Builder		
1975	Frank J. Selke	Ice hockey	Builder		
1966	Peggy Seller	Synchronized Swimming	Athlete		
1974	Frank Shaughnessy	Multisport	Builder		
1970	Marjory Shedd	Badminton	Athlete		
1955	Bill Sherring	Track Events	Athlete		
2010	Kyle Shewfelt	Artistic Gymnastics	Athlete		
2014	Kathy Shields	Basketball	Builder		
2009	Ken Shields	Basketball	Builder		
1975	Eddie Shore	Ice hockey	Athlete		
2015	William Shuttleworth	Baseball	Builder		
1975	Ben Simpson	Football	Athlete		
1975	Bullet Joe Simpson	Ice hockey	Athlete		
1971	William Simpson	Soccer	Builder		
2025	Christine Sinclair	Soccer	Athlete	Olympic gold medallist (2020); and bronze medallist (2012, 2016); All-time world international gold scorer for men or women	
1955	Ethel Smith	Athletics	Athlete	A member of the 'Matchless Six', Canada's first women's Olympic track team. Won the gold medal for the 4 × 100 m relay in the 1928 Amsterdam Olympics.	
1986	Graham Smith	Swimming	Athlete		
1982	Herman Smith-Johannsen	Cross Country Skiing	Builder		
2022	Tricia Smith	Rowing	Athlete		
1975	Conn Smythe	Ice hockey	Builder		
1955	Ross Somerville	Golf	Athlete		
1989	Gerry Sorensen	Alpine Skiing	Athlete		
2015	Henry Sotvedt	Nordic Combined	Builder		
2006	Ron Southern and Margaret Southern	Equestrian	Builders		
1966	Jim Speers	Horse Racing	Builder		
1975	Dave Sprague	Football	Athlete		
1974	Frank Stack	Speed Skating	Athlete		
2007	Robert Steadward	Para Athletics	Builder		
1992	Dave Steen	Decathlon	Athlete		
1975	Nels Stewart	Ice hockey	Athlete		
1989	Ron Stewart	Football	Athlete		
2025	Michelle Stilwell	Para athletics	Athlete	Six-time paralympic gold medallist	
1975	Bummer Stirling	Football	Athlete		
2023	Georges St-Pierre	Mixed Martial Arts	Athlete	Set record for most wins in title fights, most welterweight title defences and welterweight divisional titles.	
2006	Elvis Stojko	Figure Skating	Athlete		
1986	Red Storey	Multisport	Athlete		
1962	Marlene Streit	Golf	Athlete		
1972	Hilda Strike	Athletics	Athlete		
1991	Annis Stukus	Football	Athlete		
1983	Jack Sullivan	Sport Journalist	Builder		
2005	Summit Series Hockey Team: Don Awrey; Red Berenson; Gary Bergman; Wayne Cashman; Bobby Clarke; Yvan Cournoyer; Ron Ellis; Tony Esposito; John Ferguson Sr.; Rod Gilbert; Brian Glennie; Bill Goldsworthy; Jocelyn Guevremont; Vic Hadfield; Dennis Hull; Ed Johnston; Guy Lapointe; Peter Mahovlich; Richard Martin; Stan Mikita; J. P. Parisé; Brad Park; Gilbert Perreault; Jean Ratelle; Mickey Redmond; Serge Savard; Harry Sinden; Pat Stapleton; Dale Tallon; Bill White	Ice hockey	Athletes	Won the 1972 Summit Series, an eight-game ice hockey series between Canada and the USSR.	
2013	Alison Sydor	Mountain Bike	Athlete		
1971	Elaine Tanner	Swimming	Athlete		
2017	Charles Tator	Scientist and Neurosurgeon	Builder		
2022	John Tavares	Lacrosse	Athlete		
2013	Brenda Taylor	Rowing	Athlete		
1975	Cyclone Taylor	Ice hockey	Athlete		
1974	E. P. Taylor	Horse Racing	Builder		
1993	Ron Taylor	Baseball	Athlete		
1995	Mark Tewksbury	Swimming	Athlete		
2015	Mary Rose Thacker	Figure Skating	Athlete		
1992	Linda Thom	Shooting – Pistol	Athlete		
1960	Jim Thompson	Speed Boat	Builder		
1955	Earl Thomson	Athletics	Athlete		
2015	Stanley Thompson	Golf	Builder		
2001	Cliff Thorburn	Snooker	Athlete		
1975	Brian Timmis	Football	Athlete		
1976	Andy Tommy	Football	Athlete		
1977	Cathy Townsend	Bowling	Athlete		
1960	Jim Trifunov	Wrestling	Athlete		
2016	Bryan Trottier	Ice Hockey	Athlete	6-time Stanley Cup champion with the New York Islanders and the Pittsburgh Penguins; 9-time National Hockey League all-star	
1975	Joe Tubman	Football	Athlete		
1980	Ron Turcotte	Jockey Racing	Athlete		
1955	Dave Turner	Soccer	Athlete		
1988	Barbara Underhill	Figure Skating	Athlete		
1983	Helen Vanderburg	Synchronized Swimming	Athlete		
2015	Marina van der Merwe	Field Hockey	Builder		
2022	Adam van Koeverden	Canoe / Kayak Sprint	Athlete	4-time Olympic medallist; first Canadian male to win gold in K1-500m	
1997	Maury Van Vliet	Multisport	Builder		
2013	André Viger	Para Athletics	Athlete		
1983	Gilles Villeneuve	Auto Racing	Athlete		
2010	Jacques Villeneuve	Auto Racing	Athlete		
2023	Tessa Virtue & Scott Moir	Figure skating	Athletes	2-time Olympic gold medallists (2010, 2018); 12 Olympic and World championship podium finishes; 8 Canadian titles.	
1957	Barbara Wagner	Figure Skating	Athlete		
1991	Carolyn Waldo	Synchronized Swimming	Athlete		
2007	Larry Walker	Baseball	Athlete		
1979	Nick Wall	Horse Racing	Athlete		
1955	Angus Walters	Sailing	Athlete		
1961	Dorothy Walton	Badminton	Athlete		
1973	Keith Waples	Horse Racing	Athlete		
1969	Ken Watson	Curling	Athlete		
1975	Hawley Welch	Football	Athlete		
1971	Nick Weslock	Golf	Athlete		
1977	John Whalen	Rowing	Athlete	Member of the Outer Cove Rowing Crew, winners of the Fisherman's Race in 1901 in a record time of 9 minutes and 13 seconds	
1958	Lucille Wheeler	Alpine Skiing	Athlete		
2017	Mike Weir	Golf	Athlete		
1990	Denis Whitaker	Equestrian	Builder		
2017	Simon Whitfield	Triathlon	Athlete		
2015	Elizabeth Whittal	Swimming	Athlete		
2022	Hayley Wickenheiser	Ice hockey	Athlete	Six-time Olympian	
2022	Brian Williams	Sport Broadcaster	Builder	Decorated sports commentator, enshrined in the Canadian Football Hall of Fame	
1955	Percy Williams	Athletics	Athlete		
2000	Bruce Wilson	Soccer	Athlete	Captained Canada Men's National Soccer Team for 10 years	
1975	Harold Wilson	Speed Boat	Athlete		
1955	Jean Wilson	Speed Skating	Athlete		
1972	Walter Windeyer	Sailing	Athlete		
1977	Pappy Wood	Curling	Athlete	3-time Brier winner (1930, 1932, 1940); competed in a record 65 consecutive Manitoba Bonspiels	
1956	George Woolf	Jockey Racing	Athlete	Collected 721 wins, 589 seconds, and 468 thirds over his 19 years of racing	
2011	Lauren Woolstencroft	Para Alpine Skiing	Athlete	10-time Paralympic medallist (8 gold, 1 silver, 1 bronze); won a record 5 Paralympic gold medals at her hometown 2010 Paralympic Games	
1987	Jim Worrall	Multisport	Builder	Selected as the flag bearer for the 1936 Berlin Olympic Games; chef de mission for 1956 and 1960 Olympic Games; president of the Canadian Olympic Association; first Canadian to be appointed to the International Olympic Committee	
2012	Jeremy Wotherspoon	Speed Skating	Athlete	Olympic silver medallist (1998); 4-time World Sprint Championship winner (1999, 2000, 2002, 2003); Winner of 67 World Cup races – most of all time at the time of his retirement	
1987	Harold Wright	Multisport	Builder	President of the Canadian Olympic Association; played a major role in Montreal's successful bid for the 1976 Olympics; Governor of Canada's Sports Hall of Fame; director of the Commonwealth Games Association of Canada	
1955	Jack Wright	Tennis	Athlete	4 Canadian Men's Doubles Titles; ranked first in the country for 5 years; ranked 3rd in the world at his peak; voted Canada's Outstanding Tennis Player of the first half-century	
1955	Joe Wright Jr.	Rowing	Athlete	1928 Diamond Challenge Sculls winner; 2-time Olympic medallist (bronze, silver 1928); 1933 Grey Cup champion with the Toronto Argonauts	
1955	Joe Wright Sr.	Rowing	Athlete	Olympic silver medallist (1904); won more than 130 rowing titles; voted Canada's Outstanding Oarsman of the half-century in 1950	
2015	Rhona and Rhoda Wurtele	Alpine Skiing	Athletes	Skiing pioneers and champions in the 1940s and 50s; Canada's first official Women's Olympic Alpine Ski Team	
1955	George Young	Swimming	Athlete	First person to swim the Catalina Channel	
2002	Jim Young	Football	Athlete	2-time CFL Most Outstanding Canadian Award winner (1970, 1972); His number 30 retired by the BC Lions	
1965	Michael Young	Bobsleigh	Athlete	Member of the gold medal-winning Canadian bobsleigh team at the 1965 World Championships	
2008	Steve Yzerman	Ice hockey	Athlete	3-time Stanley Cup champion as player (1997, 1998, 2002); 2008 Stanley Cup champion as executive; Olympic gold medallist as player and general manager; Longest serving captain of a team in NHL history	
2025	Darren Zack	Softball	Athlete	Three-time Pan-American Games gold medallist (1991, 1995, 1999)	
