= Chatham Coloured All-Stars =

Canadian amateur baseball team

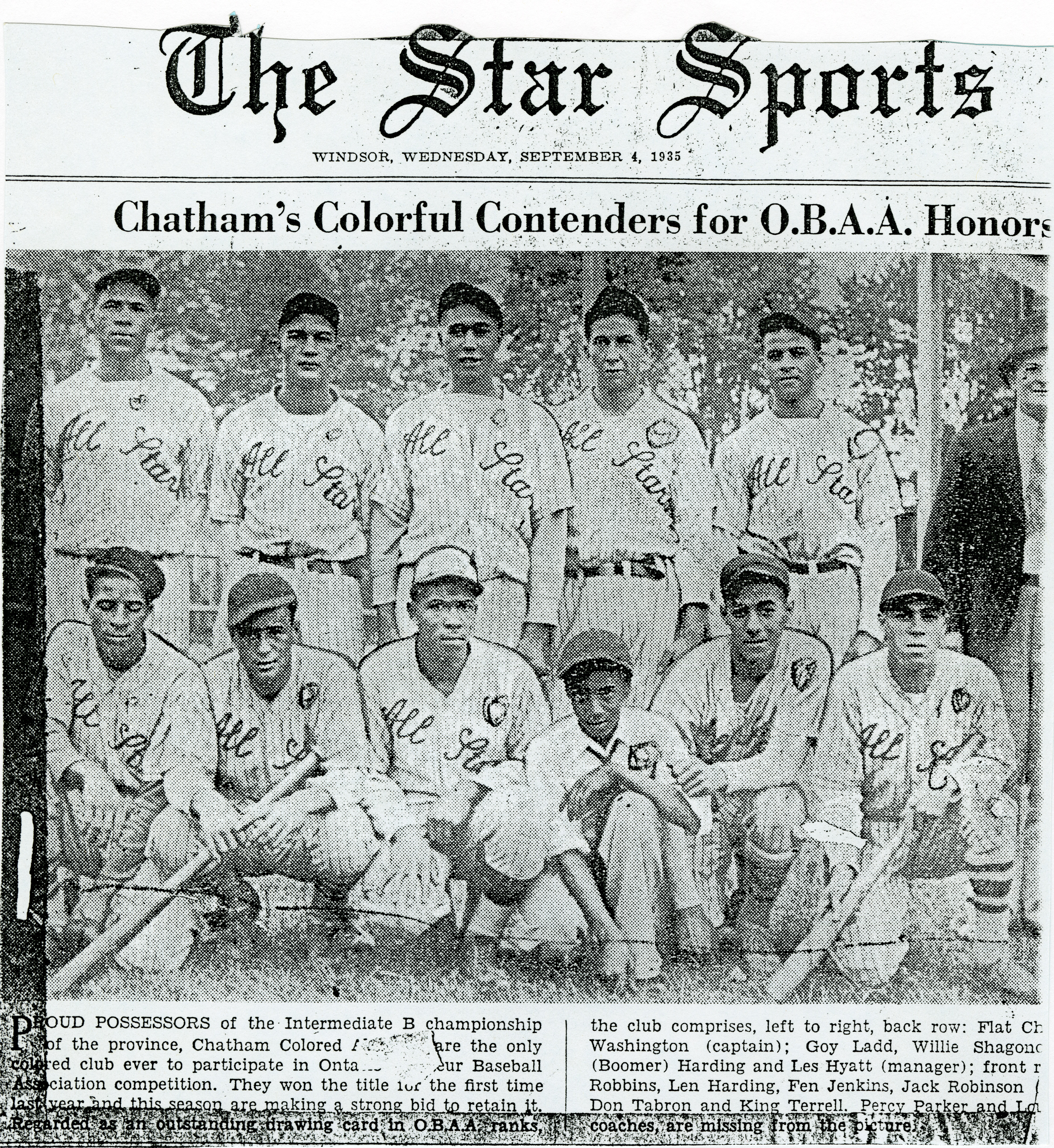
- Logo 1935 team photo

Information
- League: Ontario Baseball Amateur Association (Intermediate B)
- Location: Chatham, Ontario
- Founded: 1932
- Folded: 1939
- Division championships: 1934
- Manager: Joe "Happy" Parker

The Chatham Coloured All-Stars were Canadian amateur baseball team during the 1930s. The team included notable players such as Earl "Flat" Chase, Wilfred "Boomer" Harding, Ferguson Jenkins Sr., and Willie Shaugnosh. The 1934 edition of the team broke colour barriers as the first Black team to win a title in the Ontario Baseball Association, then known as the Ontario Baseball Amateur Association.

== History ==
The team was formed in 1932 as a group of friends playing baseball in Stirling Park in the east end of Chatham, Ontario. The following year in 1933, the team was noticed by Archie Stirling, a local business owner and representative for the Ontario Baseball Amateur Association (OBAA). This was significant because until the late 1940s black players were banned from major league baseball and were not always welcome onto white teams at the amateur level in Canada either. As the team was already barnstorming exhibition games in southern Ontario, Stirling brought them into the city league where they were able to compete against white teams. Quickly gaining in popularity, The Chatham Coloured All-Stars became known by many, including local reporters. In their second year playing in the league, they won the provincial championship, Intermediate B division, making them the first black team to win an OBAA title. In 1935, the team won the city title as well as the Western Counties Baseball Association Championship, Intermediate A division. In 1939, the Chatham Coloured All-Stars reached the all-Ontario finals but there was a dispute regarding the game location and no title was awarded that year. After this, the team ultimately stopped playing as several team members went to serve in World War II. Some of these members included Wilfred "Boomer" Harding, Andy Harding and one of the coaches Lou Pryor. Although the team had been playing for more than a decade before Jackie Robinson entered the major league in 1947, none of the Chatham Coloured All-Stars had the opportunity to play in the major leagues.

=== Challenges ===
The team was faced with many challenges being an African-Canadian team playing predominantly white teams in the 1934-time frame. There was often discrimination both on and off the field resulting in situations ranging from questionable umpire decisions during games to being turned away from hotels in the area and having to stay in nearby towns. Threats of violence were common as well as deliberate injuries to the team members, stone throwing and taunts during games.

== Aftermath ==
Throughout the 1940s and 1950s, former players joined different community teams. The Taylor ACs were formed in 1946, managed by Wilfred "Boomer" Harding and included former all-star teammates Andy Harding, Earl "Flat" Chase, King Terrell and Gouy Ladd. Years later, several sons of the original Chatham Coloured All-Stars joined this team including Earl "Flat" Chase's sons Earl Jr. and Horace and coach Louis Pryor's son Lloyd Pryor.

== Awards and recognition ==
1984: 50th anniversary of 1934 OBAA win. The City of Chatham awarded commemorative plaques to surviving members Wilfred "Boomer" Harding, Hyle Robbins, Cliff Olbey, Sagasta Harding, Don Washington and Don Tabron.

2001: The Chatham Coloured All-Stars were honoured at a Toronto Blue Jays game with the team wearing replica jerseys of the All-Stars. The two surviving members at the time, Don Tabron and Sagasta Harding as well as the son of Earl "Flat" Chase threw the first pitch at the game.

2016: Ontario Trillium Foundation awarded a grant to a team at the University of Windsor to develop an oral history project on the team as well as a range of resources to preserve and share this story. The project is titled "Breaking the Colour Barrier: Wilfred “Boomer” Harding and the Chatham Coloured All-Stars (1932-1939)".

2022: The 1934 team of the Chatham Coloured All-Stars were awarded the Order of Sport, marking induction into Canada's Sports Hall of Fame in the Trailblazer category.

In early 2022, the Canadian Baseball Hall of Fame was criticized for not inducting the Chatham Coloured All-Stars.

== Roster ==
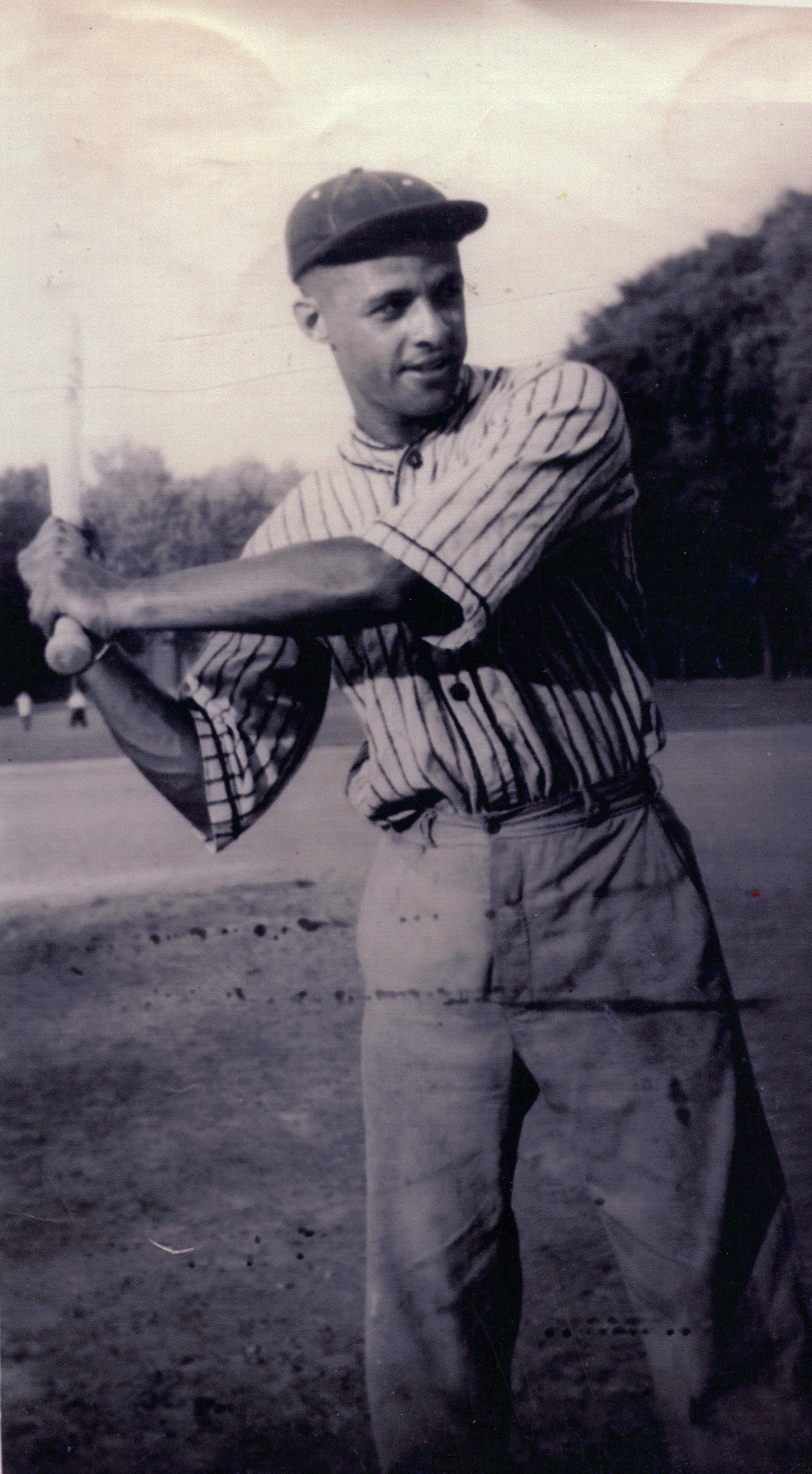
Wilfred "Boomer" Harding

The team's 1934 roster consisted of:

=== Players ===
- Earl "Flat" Chase (Windsor): pitcher, set home run records across southern Ontario
- Andy Harding (Chatham): outfielder
- Len Harding (Chatham): centre-fielder; later managed the team
- Sagasta Harding (Buxton): left-handed batter
- Wilfred "Boomer" Harding (Chatham): first-baseman; also became the first black hockey player in the International Hockey League playing for Windsor Staffords in 1946
- Ferguson Jenkins Sr. (Windsor): centre-fielder; father of Hall of Fame pitcher Ferguson Jenkins
- Gouy Ladd (Chatham): outfielder
- Cliff Olbey (Chatham): outfielder
- Hyle Robbins (Buxton): outfielder
- Stanton Robbins (Buxton): left-handed pitcher
- Wellington "Willie" Shaugnosh (Walpole Island): pitcher
- Don Tabron (Detroit): shortstop
- Ross Talbot (Chatham): first-baseman
- King Terrell (Chatham): left-handed third-baseman
- Don Washington (Detroit): catcher

=== Staff ===
- Joe "Happy" Parker (manager)
- Percy Parker (third-base coach)
- Lou Pryor (coach)
- Jack Robinson (mascot and batboy)
