= Ferguson Jenkins Sr. =

Canadian baseball player (1909–1996)

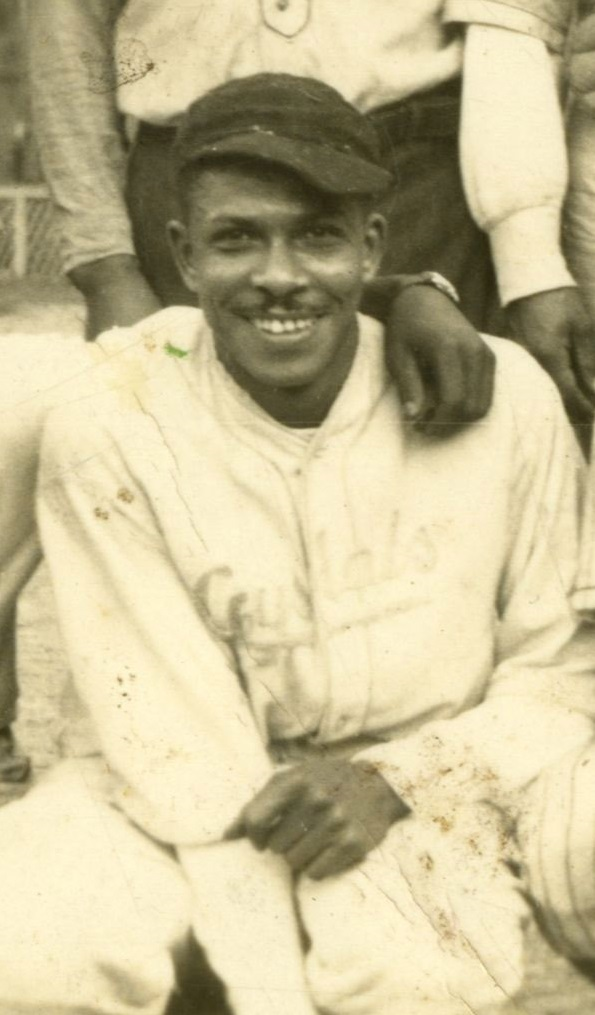
- Jenkins, circa 1935
- Born: Ferguson Holmes Jenkins c. August 1909; Windsor, Ontario, Canada
- Died: October 31, 1996 (aged 87)
- Occupation: Chef
- Known for: Baseball player with the Chatham Coloured All-Stars
- Spouse: Delores Jackson
- Children: Ferguson Jenkins (b. 1942)

Ferguson Holmes "Fergie" Jenkins (Note: Father and son had different middle names: Holmes and Arthur, respectively.) (c. August 1909 (Note: Ferguson Jenkins stated that his father was born in 1909, "maybe mid-August".) – 31 October 1996) was a Canadian baseball player, and the father of National Baseball Hall of Fame pitcher Ferguson Jenkins.

== Biography ==
Jenkins began his baseball career playing on teams in Detroit before Earl "Flat" Chase convinced him he should join the Chatham Coloured All-Stars in Chatham, Ontario. Jenkins was an outfielder and typically first in the batting order for the All-Stars, the first all-Black baseball team to win an Ontario Amateur Baseball Association championship. Teammate Kingsley Terrell stated that Jenkins was a great outfielder and he would see him catch balls thought to be uncatchable.

Jenkins was born in Windsor, Ontario, to Joseph Jenkins and Gertrude Holmes, both of whom immigrated from Barbados. Jenkins married Delores Jackson on 15 September 1942 and they had one child, Ferguson Arthur Jenkins. Their son inherited his father’s love of baseball as he went on to play in Major League Baseball (MLB) as a pitcher for the Philadelphia Phillies, Chicago Cubs, Texas Rangers, and Boston Red Sox, from 1965 through 1983, and was inducted into the National Baseball Hall of Fame. Jenkins and his wife would often attend their son’s games; though Dolores had gone blind, she would follow along via the radio.

Jenkins worked as a cook at Great Lakes Freighters and was later a chef at the William Pitt Hotel in Chatham. In addition, he worked as a chef and chauffeur for the Houston family in Chatham. He was a member of Branch 628 of the Royal Canadian Legion. Jenkins died in 1996 at the age of 87.

In 2022, Jenkins, alongside his Chatham Coloured All-Stars teammates, was awarded the Order of Sport, marking their induction into Canada's Sports Hall of Fame.
