= Ferguson Jenkins =

Canadian baseball pitcher (born 1942)

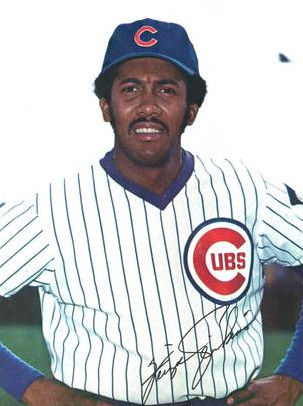
- Jenkins with the Chicago Cubs in 1973
- Pitcher
- Born: December 13, 1942 (age 83); Chatham, Ontario, Canada
- Batted: Right Threw: Right

MLB debut
- September 10, 1965, for the Philadelphia Phillies

Last MLB appearance
- September 26, 1983, for the Chicago Cubs

MLB statistics
- Win–loss record: 284–226
- Earned run average: 3.34
- Strikeouts: 3,192
- Stats at Baseball Reference

Teams
- Philadelphia Phillies (1965–1966); Chicago Cubs (1966–1973); Texas Rangers (1974–1975); Boston Red Sox (1976–1977); Texas Rangers (1978–1981); Chicago Cubs (1982–1983)

Career highlights and awards
- 3× All-Star (1967, 1971, 1972); NL Cy Young Award (1971); 2× Wins leader (1971, 1974); NL strikeout leader (1969); Chicago Cubs No. 31 retired; Chicago Cubs Hall of Fame; Texas Rangers Hall of Fame

Member of the National

Baseball Hall of Fame
- Induction: 1991
- Vote: 75.4% (third ballot)

Ferguson Arthur "Fergie" Jenkins (Note: While Jenkins's father became known as Ferguson Jenkins Sr., father and son had different middle names.) (born December 13, 1942) is a Canadian former professional baseball pitcher and coach. He played Major League Baseball (MLB) from 1965 to 1983 for the Philadelphia Phillies, Chicago Cubs, Texas Rangers and Boston Red Sox.

Jenkins played most of his career with the Cubs. He was a National League (NL) and Cubs All-Star for three seasons, and in 1971, he was the first Canadian and Cubs pitcher to win a Cy Young Award. He was a 20-game winner for seven seasons, including six consecutive seasons for the Cubs. He was the NL leader in wins, in 1971, and the American League (AL) leader in wins, in 1974. Jenkins was also the NL leader in complete games in 1967, 1970, and 1971, and the AL leader in complete games in 1974. He led the NL in strikeouts in 1969 and had over 3,000 strikeouts during his career. His 284 victories are the most by a black pitcher in major league history.

Jenkins played basketball in the off-season for the Harlem Globetrotters from 1967 to 1969, and pitched two seasons in Canada for the minor league London Majors following his major league career. Jenkins became the first Canadian to be inducted into the National Baseball Hall of Fame in 1991; he remained the only one until Larry Walker's election in 2020.

== Early life ==
Jenkins was born and raised in Chatham, Ontario, the only child of Delores Jackson and Ferguson Jenkins Sr. His father, a chef and chauffeur, was the son of immigrants from Barbados, while his mother was a descendant of captive Africans enslaved in America, who escaped through the Underground Railroad before settling in Southwestern Ontario. Both of his parents were good athletes; his father was an amateur boxer and semi-professional baseball player for the Chatham Coloured All-Stars.

A talented athlete, Jenkins competed in track and field, ice hockey, and basketball in his school years, lettering five times. When he began playing bantam baseball in his teens, he started out as a first baseman. He honed his pitching skills by throwing pieces of coal from a local coal yard, aiming at either an open ice chute or the gaps of passing boxcars. He was also encouraged to continue working on his pitching by Gene Dziadura, a former shortstop in the Chicago Cubs minor league system, and a Philadelphia Phillies scout. Many training sessions involving the two followed, until Jenkins graduated from high school.

== Professional baseball ==
=== MLB career ===
==== Early seasons ====
In 1962, Jenkins was signed by Philadelphia Phillies scout Tony Lucadello. Jenkins made his major-league debut as a 22-year-old in 1965, as a relief pitcher. He was traded the following year to the Chicago Cubs, along with Adolfo Phillips and John Herrnstein, for pitchers Larry Jackson and Bob Buhl. Jenkins would become one of the best pitchers in the majors. In his first full year as a starter for the Cubs (1967), Jenkins recorded 20 wins while posting a 2.80 ERA and 236 strikeouts. He finished tied for second in the Cy Young Award voting, following Mike McCormick of the San Francisco Giants. He was also selected for the All-Star Game for the first time that season.

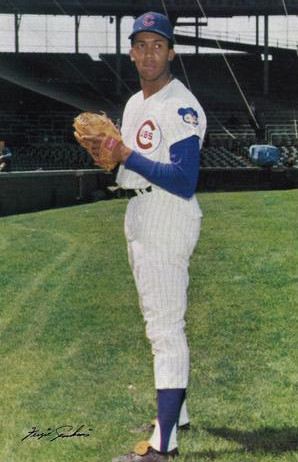
Jenkins in 1969

The following year his numbers improved; once again he won 20 games, his ERA dropped to 2.63 and his strikeout total increased to 260. Jenkins established a reputation for achieving his pitching feats and his statistics while spending most of his career pitching in a "hitter's ballpark"—Wrigley Field in Chicago. Furthermore, in 1968, Jenkins lost five of his starts in 1–0 ball games.

==== 1971 season ====
Jenkins had his best season in 1971. On April 6, 1971, Jenkins started the Cubs' opening-day game. The Cubs defeated the St. Louis Cardinals 2–1 in 10 innings at Wrigley Field. Jenkins pitched the complete game for the Cubs, and Billy Williams hit a home run in the final inning for the victory. On September 1, 1971, Jenkins threw another complete game against the Montreal Expos and hit two home runs. The Cubs won the game 5–2. He was named NL Player of the Month (for the only time in his career) in July, with a 6–1 record, a 2.14 ERA, and 49 strikeouts.

That season, Jenkins threw a complete game in 30 of 39 starts and received a decision in 37 of them, finishing with a 24–13 record (.649). He walked only 37 batters versus 263 strikeouts across 325 innings. He played in the All-Star Game and finished seventh in MVP voting. Jenkins also posted a .478 slugging percentage, hitting six home runs and driving in 20 runs in just 115 at-bats.

Jenkins won the 1971 NL Cy Young Award. Jenkins was the first Cubs pitcher and the first Canadian to win the Cy Young Award (Quebec native Éric Gagné is the only other Canadian to match the feat). He received 17 of 24 first-place votes. He was outpitched in several statistical categories by New York Mets pitcher Tom Seaver, but Jenkins pitched in hitter-friendly Wrigley Field and Seaver worked in pitcher-friendly Shea Stadium.

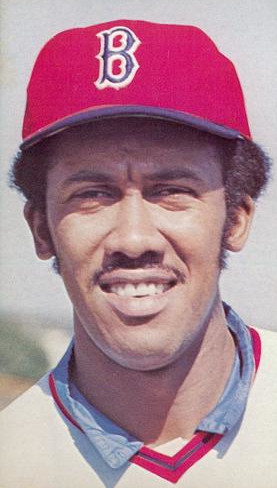
Jenkins with the Red Sox in 1976

==== Later seasons ====
In 1972, Jenkins completed his sixth consecutive season with 20 or more wins. By the middle of the following season, he expressed that he did not feel like playing baseball anymore. He finished the season, but registered a 14–16 win–loss record.

Jenkins was traded from the Cubs to the Texas Rangers for Bill Madlock and Vic Harris on October 25, 1973. Texas manager Billy Martin was pleased with the trade, describing Jenkins as a workhorse and a winner. In 1974, Jenkins achieved a personal best 25 wins during the season, setting a Rangers franchise record which still stands. He finished second in Cy Young Award voting for the second time in his career behind Catfish Hunter in a very close vote (90 points to Jenkins's 75); surprisingly, Jenkins actually finished ahead of Hunter in MVP voting (118 points to Hunter's 107), and his fifth-place finish on the MVP leader-board was the highest of his career. He was named the American League Comeback Player of the Year by The Sporting News.

Jenkins achieved his 250th win against the Oakland Athletics on May 23, 1980. Later that year, during a customs search in Toronto, Jenkins was found possessing 3.0 grams cocaine, 2.2 grams hashish, and 1.75 grams marijuana. In response, on September 8, Commissioner Bowie Kuhn suspended him indefinitely. However, Jenkins' suspension would only last two weeks before, in an unprecedented action, independent arbiter Raymond Goetz would overturn the suspension and reinstate him, allowing him to return to the league. Eventually, when he went to trial, the judge gave him an absolute discharge for lack of some evidence. Jenkins was not punished further by MLB for the incident, as he remained active until his retirement following the 1983 season. It has been suggested that this incident delayed his induction into the Baseball Hall of Fame.

=== Canadian baseball ===
==== Minor league ====
Jenkins continued playing professional baseball in Canada after retiring from MLB in 1983 and pitched two seasons for the London Majors, a minor league team of the Intercounty Major Baseball League, operating in London, Ontario.

== Post-baseball ==
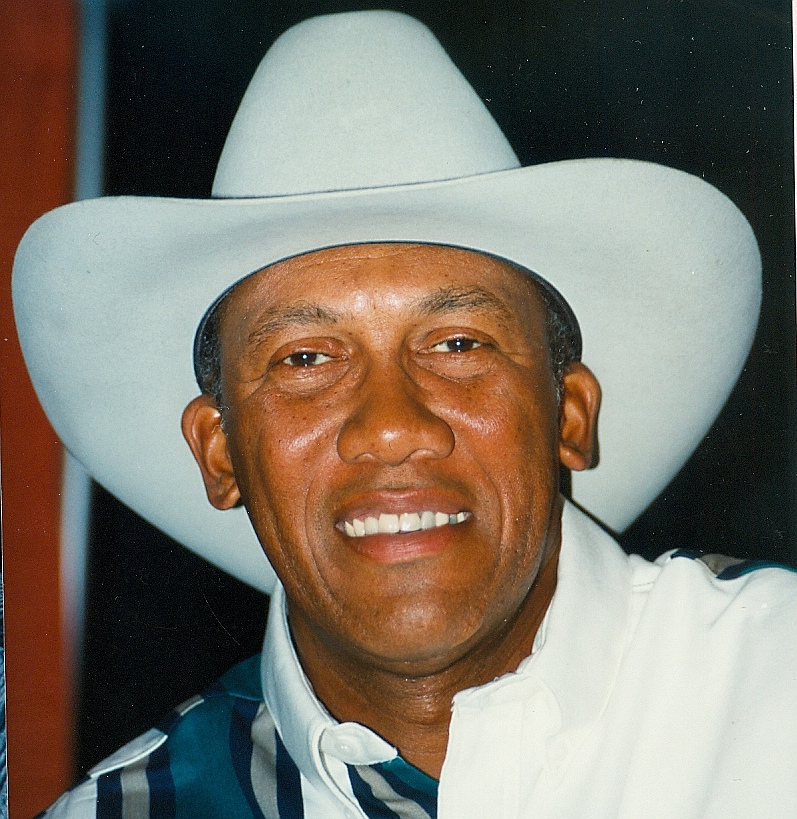
Jenkins in 1997

Jenkins ran for the Ontario Liberal Party in the 1985 Ontario general election, in the riding of Windsor—Riverside, but placed third with 15% of the vote behind the NDP's Dave Cooke.

== Legacy ==
Jenkins led the league in wins twice (1971, 1974), fewest walks per 9 innings five times, complete games nine times, and home runs allowed seven times. He led the league in strikeouts once (1969, with 273). His streak of six straight seasons with 20 or more wins (1967–1972) is the longest streak in the major leagues since Warren Spahn performed the feat between 1956 and 1961.

Jenkins, fellow Cub Greg Maddux, Curt Schilling, and Pedro Martínez are the only major league pitchers to ever record more than 3,000 strikeouts with fewer than 1,000 walks. Only Robin Roberts and Jamie Moyer allowed more home runs over a career than Jenkins. Jenkins achieved his 3,000th strikeout on May 25, 1982, against Garry Templeton.

As a hitter, Jenkins posted a .165 batting average (148-for-896) with 54 runs, 13 home runs, 85 RBI and 41 bases on balls. Defensively, he recorded a .954 fielding percentage.

Jenkins is one of the Black Aces, black pitchers with at least 20 wins in a single MLB season.

=== Honours and awards ===
Ferguson Jenkins's number 31 was retired by the Chicago Cubs in 2009.

In 1974, Jenkins, then with the Texas Rangers, became the first baseball player to win the Lou Marsh Trophy, an award given annually to Canada's top athlete. He was also named the Canadian Press male athlete of the year four times (1967, 1968, 1971, and 1974).

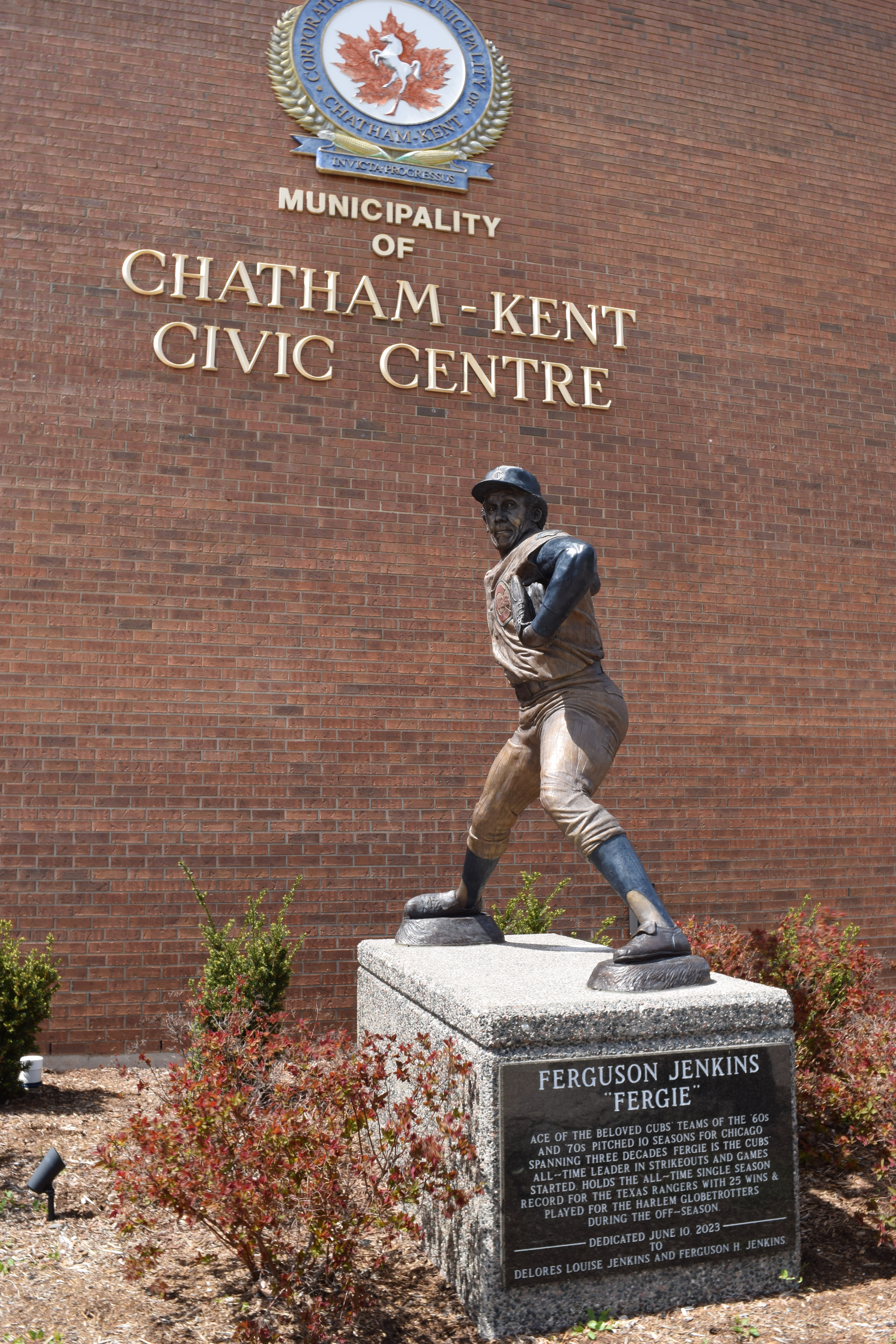
Ferguson Jenkins Statue outside the Chatham Civic Centre.

In 1987, Jenkins was awarded the Order of Sport, marking his induction into Canada's Sports Hall of Fame. Jenkins was inducted into the Canadian Baseball Hall of Fame in 1987, and in 1991, became the first Canadian ever elected to the Baseball Hall of Fame in Cooperstown, New York. The 1991 Major League Baseball All-Star Game, held in Toronto, was dedicated to Jenkins; he threw out the ceremonial first pitch to conclude the pregame ceremonies. Jenkins was inducted into the Ontario Sports Hall of Fame in 1995, and was inducted onto Canada's Walk of Fame in 2001. He was appointed the commissioner of the now-defunct Canadian Baseball League in 2003; the league's Jenkins Cup went missing when the league folded and has been missing ever since. He was inducted into the Texas Rangers Hall of Fame in 2004. In 2011, the Ontario Sports Hall of Fame created the Ferguson Jenkins Heritage Award in his honour to commemorate those one-of-a-kind events or special moments in time that so embellish the long history of sports in Ontario.

On December 17, 1979, he was made a Member of the Order of Canada for being "Canada's best-known major-league baseball player". Governor General Michaëlle Jean officiated at his investiture into the Order, which finally occurred on May 4, 2007, more than 27 years after he was appointed. On May 3, 2009, the Cubs retired jersey number 31 in honor of both Jenkins and Greg Maddux. On December 13, 2010, Canada Post announced Jenkins would be honoured in Canada with his own postage stamp. The stamp was issued on February 1, 2011, to commemorate Black History Month. On May 20, 2022, Jenkins was honored with a statue outside Wrigley Field. On June 10, 2023, Jenkins was also honoured with a statue outside the Chatham Civic Centre, in his hometown of Chatham, as well was honoured with a portrait of himself on May 17, 2024, by local artist Lucy Thrift, adorned to the outside wall of Fergie Jenkins Field, also in Chatham.

== Personal life ==
Jenkins had three daughters with his first wife, Kathy, whom he divorced in 1987.

Jenkins had one child, a daughter named Samantha, with his second wife, Maryanne. In December 1990, Maryanne broke her neck in a car accident near their ranch in Guthrie, Oklahoma. She died from pneumonia in January 1991.

In December 1992, Jenkins' girlfriend, Cynthia Takieddine, and Jenkins' three-year-old daughter, Samantha Jenkins, died of carbon monoxide poisoning in her car near Perry, Oklahoma. It was ruled a murder-suicide although Takieddine's motives were not clear in the suicide note. It did say she loved Samantha and could not bear to leave her.

Jenkins was married to Lydia Farrington from 1993 until her death in 2018.

== See also ==
- List of Major League Baseball career wins leaders
- List of Major League Baseball players from Canada
- List of Major League Baseball annual strikeout leaders
- List of Major League Baseball annual wins leaders
- List of Major League Baseball career hit batsmen leaders
- List of Major League Baseball career strikeout leaders
- List of members of Canada's Sports Hall of Fame
- List of Canadian sports personalities

== Notes ==
Preceded by Willie Stargell	Major League Player of the Month; July 1971	Succeeded by Joe Torre
