= Earl Chase =

Canadian baseball player (1910–1954)

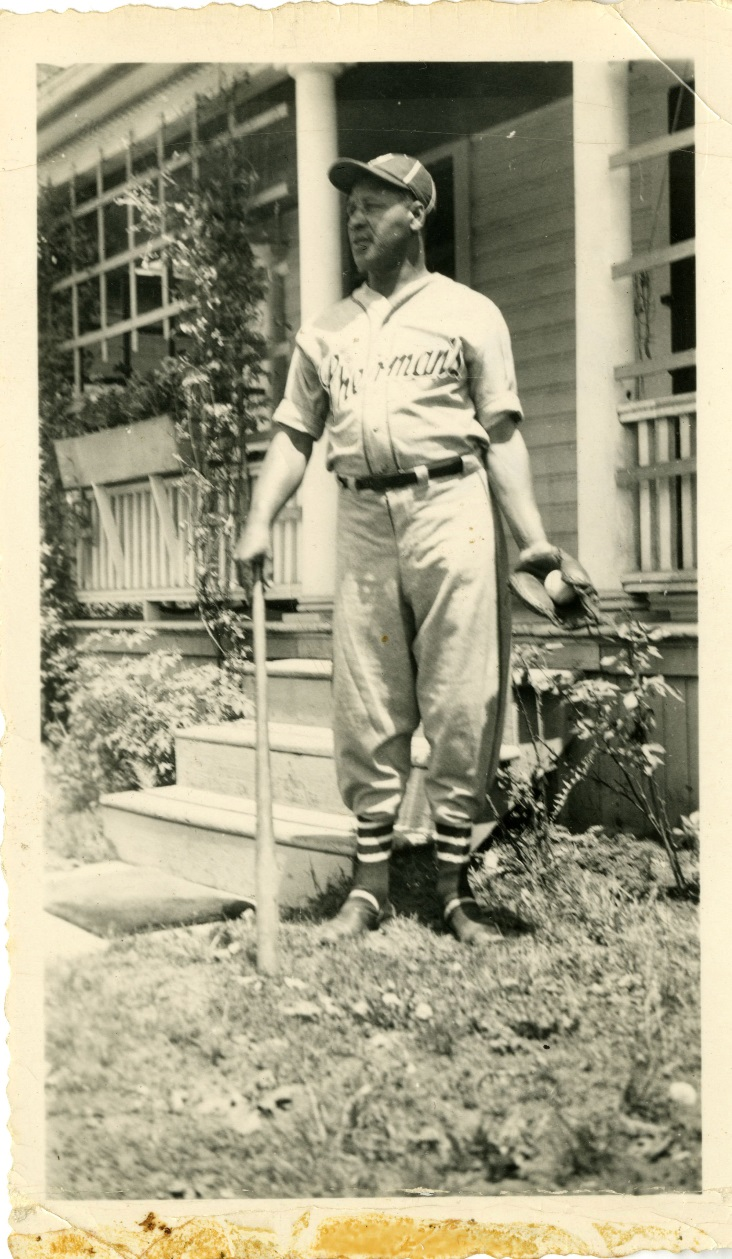
- Chase, circa 1934
- Born: August 16, 1910; North Buxton, Ontario, Canada
- Died: May 5, 1954 (aged 43); Elmstead, Ontario, Canada
- Known for: Baseball player with the Chatham Coloured All-Stars
- Spouse: Julia Ethel Black
- Children: 4

Earl "Flat" Chase (16 August 1910 – 5 May 1954) (Note: The University of Windsor's internet content about the Chatham Coloured All-Stars lists Chase's birth date as 16 August 1913. The contemporary newspaper report of his death in 1954 gave his age as 43 (equating to a birth year of 1910 or 1911); the Chatham Sports Hall of Fame lists his birth year as 1910.) was a Canadian baseball player. A two-way player—both a power hitter and a pitcher—he played for the Chatham Coloured All-Stars, the first Black baseball team to win an Ontario Baseball Amateur Association (OBAA) title.

== Biography ==
Chase was born in North Buxton, Ontario, to George Chase and Elva Gambril. He had eight siblings. When he moved to Windsor, Ontario, in the 1920s, his home was located across the street from a ballpark where he spent majority of his free time. His nickname is attributed to him having flat feet.

By the age of 15, Chase played on baseball teams through churches such as the Second Baptist Church and the Detroit Church League Champs. He continued playing baseball and was quite well known throughout the community. He was said to be a "very versatile player as he could catch, pitch, and play all infield positions". In 1934, Chase was recruited by the Chatham Coloured All-Stars. The All-Stars regularly had to endure overt racial discrimination on and off the field. In the deciding game of the 1934 championship, Chase out-pitched his counterpart, Phil Marchildon, on the Penetanguishene team.

Much like teammate Wilfred "Boomer" Harding, it was said that the one factor that might have kept Chase out of the major leagues in the 1930s was the colour of his skin. Teammates made similar statements, suggesting that "Chase should have been a big league pitcher." Chase's pitches ranged from 80 to 100 miles per hour (130 to 160 km/h), and he had set many records for longest hits across different baseball parks, including those in Sarnia, Strathroy, Aylmer, Welland, Milton, and Chatham. He once had a .700 batting average while he was playing in the Chatham City League. Harding stated that once during a game in Welland, Chase hit the ball so hard that "the ball not only cleared the right field fence, it cleared a building way behind the fence" and eventually was said to land in downtown Welland.

Chase played on various other baseball teams, including the London Majors, Patterson Cars, Windsor City League Champions, Windsor Stars, Chatham Shermans, Chatham Hadleys and Arcades. He also played with the Taylor AC Panthers, where many other former All-Stars and their children went to play. While part of the London Majors, he helped bring them to victory by pitching the Canadian Sandlot Congress championship in 1944.

Outside of baseball, Chase worked in the sanitation department in Chatham. He married Julia Ethel Black in 1934. They had four children: Earl Jr., Horace, Marilyn, and Gladys. Chase’s two sons later followed in his footsteps and played with the Panthers in the 1950s. Chase died in May 1954 at age 43; he was found dead in a cabin in Elmstead, Ontario, which was later determined to have been a case of accidental carbon monoxide poisoning.

Chase was inducted to the Chatham Sports Hall of Fame in 2001.

Chase, alongside his Chatham Coloured All-Stars teammates, was awarded the Order of Sport, marking induction into Canada's Sports Hall of Fame in 2022.
