= Willie Shaugnosh =

Canadian baseball player (1914–1982)

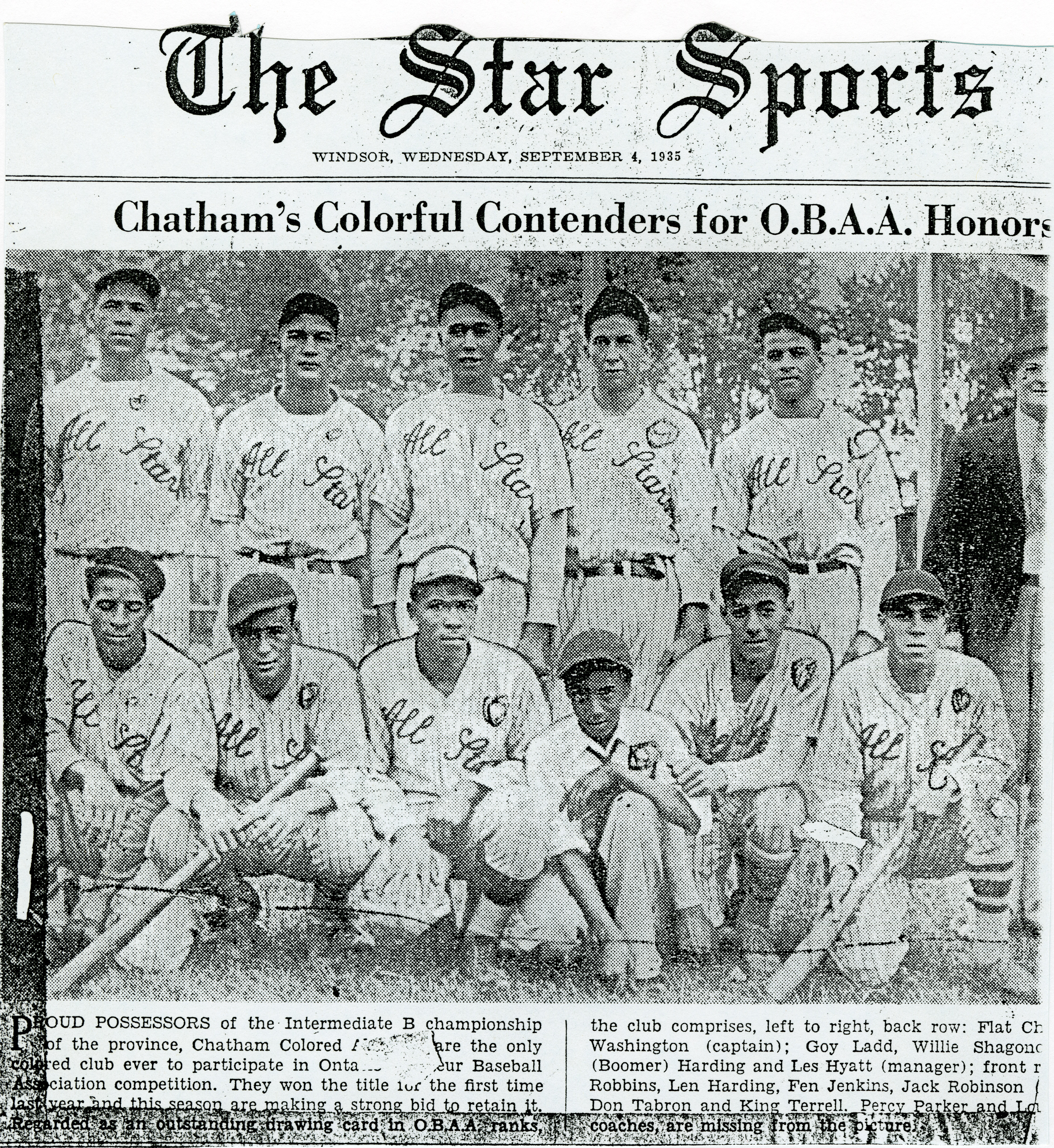
1935 Chatham Coloured All-Stars. Willie Shaugnosh is the second player from the right, back row

Wellington "Willie" Shaugnosh (28 February 1914 – February 1982) was a First Nations man from Walpole Island, Ontario, and Waubuno, Ontario. Shaugnosh was a member of the Chatham Coloured All-Stars baseball team in Chatham, Ontario. The spelling of his last name varies and can sometimes also be found in newspaper articles written as "Shagonosh" and similar variations.

In 1935, Shaugnosh arrived in Chatham to play baseball for the barrier-breaking Chatham Coloured All-Stars who had won the Ontario Baseball Amateur Association Championship in 1934. Shaugnosh was said to be the "best pitcher in the Western Counties League". He was also known by his tall stature as well as his hitting and fielding abilities. A 1935 article in the Chatham Daily News stated, "The Stars have met with in-and-out fortune all along the way. Their work of today, however, is marked by an improvement over anything the club has previously shown. This is due, in great degree, to the increased effectiveness of Willie Shaugnosh, Indian pitcher, who came to the team this year from Waubuno and Walpole Island".

Newspaper reports often expressed admiration for the skills of Shaugnosh's pitching.

In August 1950, Shaugnosh married Velma Stonefish. After his time with the All-Stars, he moved to Detroit and worked as a laborer.
