= Noel MacDonald =

Canadian basketball player (1915–2008)

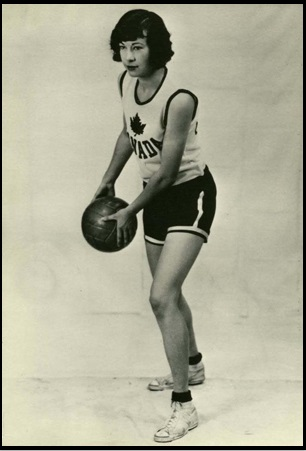

Personal information
- Born: 23 January 1915 Mortlach, Saskatchewan
- Died: 13 May 2008 (aged 93) Edmonton, Alberta
- Listed height: 5 ft 10 in (1.78 m)

Career information
- Playing career: 1931–1939
- Position: Captain

Career history
- 1931-33: Edmonton Gradettes
- 1933-39: Edmonton Grads

Career statistics
- Points per game: 13.8
- Points: 1,874

Noel Marguerite Robertson (née MacDonald; January 23, 1915 – May 13, 2008) was a basketball player for the Edmonton Grads. In 1938, MacDonald was awarded the Bobbie Rosenfeld Award and Velma Springstead Trophy as the best Canadian female athlete of the year. She is one of the few people who have been inducted into Canada's Sports Hall of Fame twice, and was also inducted into the Canada Basketball Hall of Fame in 1978.

== Early life and education ==
On January 23, 1915, Noel MacDonald was born in Mortlach, Saskatchewan. She spent her childhood in Estevan and Moose Jaw. MacDonald went to Edmonton as a teenager. She was on girls basketball teams while completing her education.

== Career ==
MacDonald started her basketball career with the Edmonton Gradettes in 1931 before joining the Edmonton Grads in 1933. On the Grads, she played as a forward and centre before being promoted to captain in 1936. After her promotion to captain, MacDonald and her teammates won a demonstration basketball tournament at the 1936 Summer Olympics. MacDonald retired from the Grads in 1939 with a points per game average of 13.8 and an all-time Grads best of 1,874 points. After her retirement, MacDonald became a basketball coach in Estevan, Saskatchewan and a secretary in Libya.

== Awards and achievements ==
In 1938, MacDonald won the Velma Springstead Trophy for best female athlete of Canada. When MacDonald won the Bobbie Rosenfeld Award the same year, she became the first and only woman to receive the award for women's basketball. In 1944, she was named by her former coach Percy Page as the best player in the history of the Edmonton Grads.

MacDonald was inducted into the Canada Basketball Hall of Fame in 1978. She is one of only ten people who have been inducted into Canada's Sports Hall of Fame twice. She was first awarded the Order of Sport (marking induction into Canada's Sports Hall of Fame) in 1971, and again as a member of the Edmonton Grads in 2017.

== Personal life ==
In 1939, with 17 games left in her final season MacDonald eloped with Harry Robertson, a former Canadian National hockey player turned oil businessman (in Idaho) keeping their marriage secret for the remainder of the season as married women were not allowed to play on the team. They had two children together. Son Donald, and daughter Dale Larsen, with three grandchildren. Jordan Robertson, Damion Larsen and Kalia Larsen Edmunds.

== Death ==
On May 13, 2008, MacDonald died from Alzheimer's disease in Edmonton, Alberta.
