= Carol Ann Duthie =

Canadian water skier

Personal information
- Full name: Carol-Ann Duthie-MacDonald
- Born: February 18, 1937 Toronto, Ontario
- Died: August 14, 2001 (aged 64) Toronto, Ontario
Medal record
Water Skiing
Representing Canada
Water Ski World Championships
Bronze medal – third place	1951 Cypress Gardens	Junior's Slalom

Carol Ann MacDonald née Duthie (18 February 1937 — 14 August 2001) was a Canadian water skier. She won multiple medals in water skiing including a bronze medal at the 1951 Water Ski World Championships. Duthie was posthumously awarded the Order of Sport, marking her induction into Canada's Sports Hall of Fame in 2015.

== Early life ==
Duthie was born on 18 February 1937 in Toronto, Ontario. She completed her high school education at Etobicoke Collegiate Institute and graduated from the University of Toronto with a physical education degree.

== Career ==
Duthie began water skiing as a teenager. As a junior competitor, she won gold at the 1950 Canadian Water Ski Championships and bronze at the 1951 Water Ski World Championships. The following year, she won multiple competitions at the 1952 Mexican Championships.

In 1953, she placed in first in various championships including the World Junior Water Skiing Championships. She was a member of the international water ski team of Canada for six years. Other medals that Duthie won at were from the Ontario Water Ski Championship and Eastern Canada Water Ski Championship throughout the 1950s. Apart from her water skiing career, Duthie was a teacher and a National Ballet of Canada director.

== Awards and honors ==
In 1956, Duthie and her father George Duthie were inducted into the Canadian Amateur Sports Hall of Fame while she was separately inducted into the Canadian Olympic Hall of Fame. In 1998, Duthie was inducted into the Etobicoke Sports Hall Of Fame. After her death, she was posthumously named into the Canada's Sports Hall of Fame in 2015.

== Death ==
Duthie died on 14 August 2001 in Toronto.

== Personal life ==
Duthie was married and had three children.
