= Windsor Gotfredsons =

Minor-league ice hockey team in Windsor, Ontario, Canada (1945–1950)

The Windsor Gotfredsons were a minor league professional ice hockey team and one of the four founding members of the International Hockey League in 1945. The team was based in Windsor, Ontario and played at the Windsor Arena. After one season, they became known as the Windsor Staffords, and two years later became Windsor Ryan Cretes. The team played five seasons total, folding in 1950.

== Season-by-season results ==
Season	Team	Games	Won	Lost	Tied	Points	Pct %	Goals for	Goals against	Standing
1945–46	Gotfredsons	15	8	4	3	19	0.633	90	72	2nd, IHL
1946–47	Staffords	28	17	8	3	37	0.661	167	138	1st, IHL
1947–48	Staffords	30	8	21	1	17	0.283	117	188	6th, IHL
1948–49	Ryan Cretes	31	0	25	6	6	0.097	89	177	6th, North
1949–50	Ryan Cretes	40	10	25	5	25	0.313	152	236	5th, IHL
Totals		144	43	83	18	104	0.361	615	811	

== See also ==
- List of ice hockey teams in Ontario
- Wilfred "Boomer" Harding, first Black player in the International Hockey League, with the Windsor Staffords in 1946
