= Boomer Harding =

Canadian multi-sport athlete

Wilfred Harding
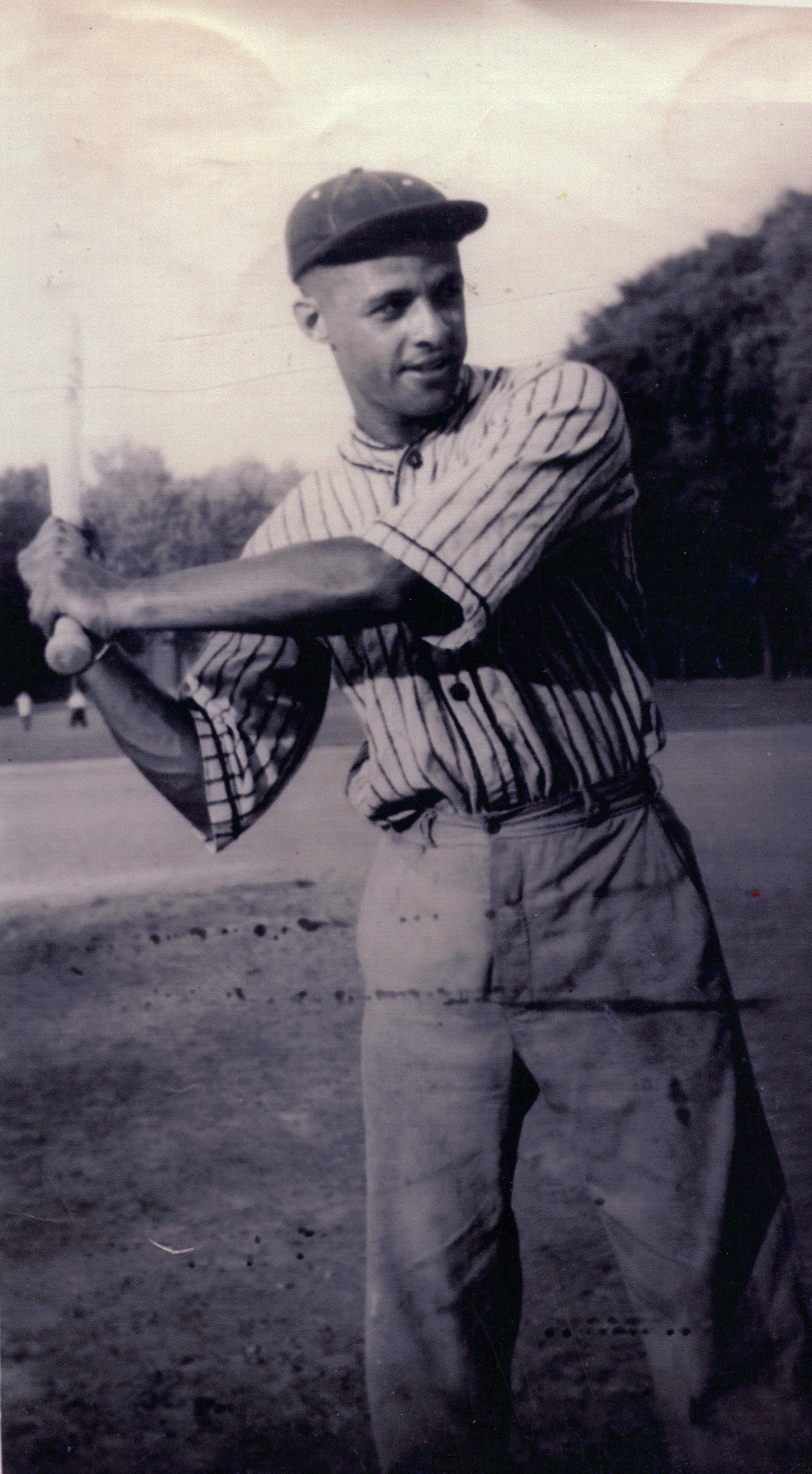
- Harding in 1934
- Born: Wilfred Harding; August 6, 1915; Chatham, Ontario, Canada
- Died: September 14, 1991 (aged 76)
- Occupation(s): Athlete, letter carrier
- Years active: c. 1933 – c. 1988
- Known for: Baseball player with the Chatham Coloured All-Stars, ice hockey player with the Windsor Staffords
- Spouse: Joy Handsor
- Children: 1

Wilfred "Boomer" Harding (6 August 1915 – 14 September 1991) was a Canadian multi-sport athlete. He was best known as a baseball player with the Chatham Coloured All-Stars, and was the first Black player in the International Hockey League.

== Biography ==
Harding was born in Chatham, Ontario, to parents Sarah (Holmes) Harding and Andrew "Bill" Harding. He had seven siblings: Carl, Georgina, Florence, Beulah, James Leonard ("Len"), Andrew, and Wanda. Harding played baseball and ice hockey, while his abilities were also recognized in track as well as basketball and soccer. While attending Chatham Vocational High School, Harding won titles for pole vaulting, basketball, soccer and hockey. However, being born in 1915, when there was a color barrier in society and sports, Harding faced many challenges and struggled to advance his sports career due to the colour of his skin. Before the 1940s, black athletes were not allowed to be part of most professional leagues and were rarely wanted in amateur leagues. Despite the constant discrimination, Harding was known by those who were close to him as very compassionate, friendly, kind and a gentleman.

=== Baseball career ===
While he was a teenager, Harding joined the Chatham Coloured All-Stars, which was a local baseball team in Chatham, Ontario. His position was first baseman, and he was known to be on the bases regularly due to his hitting capabilities. The Chatham Daily News reported that he "bats in third position on the line-up and is a hard man to keep off the base-paths." The team was noticed by a local business owner, Archie Stirling an Ontario Baseball Amateur Association (OBAA) representative, who brought them to play in the league. Being an all-Black team, this was quite significant but also led to many challenges for the team regarding discrimination. Harding was one of the team members who faced this discrimination head-on, which brought him the respect of many people around him. The team won the Ontario Baseball Amateur Association Intermediate B Championship in 1934. This made them the first Black team to win a championship in the league. During the time of the championship win in 1934, Harding had a .339 batting average.

=== World War II and beyond ===
In April 1940, Harding married Joy Handsor and together they had a son, Blake Harding. Harding joined the Canadian Armed Forces during World War II, as did a few of his other teammates. Although he was overseas with the Canadian Army, Harding still continued with his sports career by competing in pole vaulting as well as a travelling hockey team with other Canadian soldiers.

Once Harding completed his time with the army, he was able to return to Canada. He also obtained a job at the Chatham Post Office, where he worked as a letter carrier for 35 years. In 1946, Harding made the decision to try out for the International Amateur Hockey League. His tryout was successful and he earned a spot playing hockey with the Windsor Staffords, a farm team of the Detroit Red Wings. This was historically significant, as Harding broke a color barrier by being the first Black player in the International Amateur Hockey League. Harding may also have been the first Black player to skate at the Detroit Olympia. Before joining the Staffords, he had been denied access to the ice while the arena was open to the public; pointing out a sign stating that it was open to the public, a staff member replied by saying, "well, that sign doesn't mean what you think it means." He eventually skated at the Olympia while a member of the Staffords.

As the Chatham Coloured All-Stars had come to an end, Harding played on and managed a new baseball team that was formed in 1946 called the Taylor ACs, later known as the Taylor AC Panthers and Kent Panthers. These teams had many of Harding's former teammates, and years later the legacy carried on with the team containing children of the original All-Star members. In addition, Harding played on other baseball teams that were part of then-renamed Ontario Baseball Association (OBA), such as the Chatham Hadleys in 1948 and the Blenheim Braves in 1957. Harding won another OBA championship (Intermediate A) with the Chatham Hadleys in 1948.

=== Later years ===
Harding retired from working at the Chatham Post Office in 1975. As a veteran of World War II, he was also part of the Royal Canadian Legion in Branch 628 where he played soccer in the 1940s. He played darts on national teams where he was titled one of the top senior players in Canada. In 1975, he won second place in the Canadian National Open Darts Tournament. For many years, Harding also acted as an officiant in sports such as hockey and baseball in the Kent County Leagues. Having been born in times of racial segregation, Harding never had a chance to try out for major league teams in baseball or hockey.

== Legacy ==
Harding earned various awards during his sports career. Other achievements include:

- 1934: Harding helped bring Chatham Coloured All-Stars to be the first Black team to win the Ontario Baseball Amateur Association Intermediate B Championship.
- 1946: Harding was the first Black player to skate at the Detroit Olympia arena.
- 1975: Harding won second place in the Canadian National Open Darts Tournament.
- 1984: 50th anniversary of 1934 OBAA win. The City of Chatham awarded commemorative plaques to surviving members; Harding attended to receive his award.
- 1988: Harding was awarded an Olympic Gold Medal of Achievement to honour his 50 years of sport achievements, one of only 18 Canadians so honoured.
- 2003: Harding was inducted into the Chatham Sports Hall of Fame.
- 2022: Harding, alongside his Chatham Coloured All-Stars teammates, was awarded the Order of Sport, marking induction into Canada's Sports Hall of Fame.

In 2015, Harding's daughter-in-law, Pat Harding, had a chance encounter with University of Windsor history professor Miriam Wright and spoke about scrapbooks she created with news clippings kept by Harding's mother. This led to a collaborative project between the Harding family, the University of Windsor, and the Chatham Sports Hall of Fame, preserving the history of Harding and the Chatham Coloured All-Stars. The project is titled "Breaking the Colour Barrier: Wilfred 'Boomer' Harding & the Chatham Coloured All-Stars (1932-1939)".
