= Order of Sport =

Canadian sport award

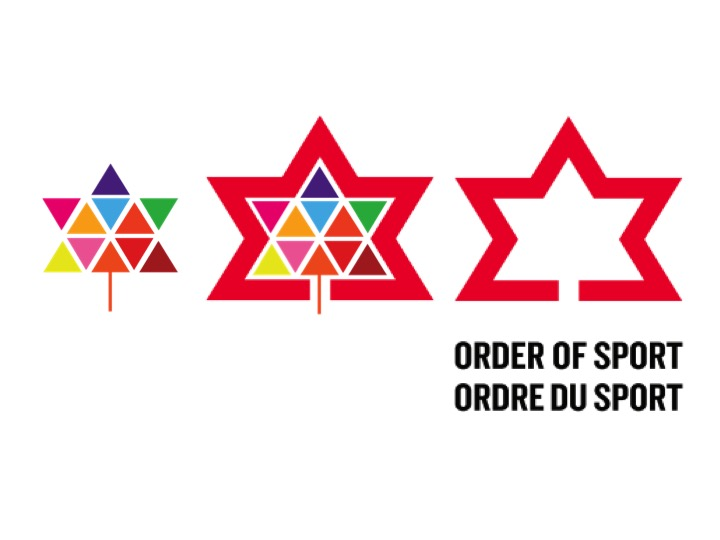
The Order of Sport symbol represents Canada's highest sporting honour

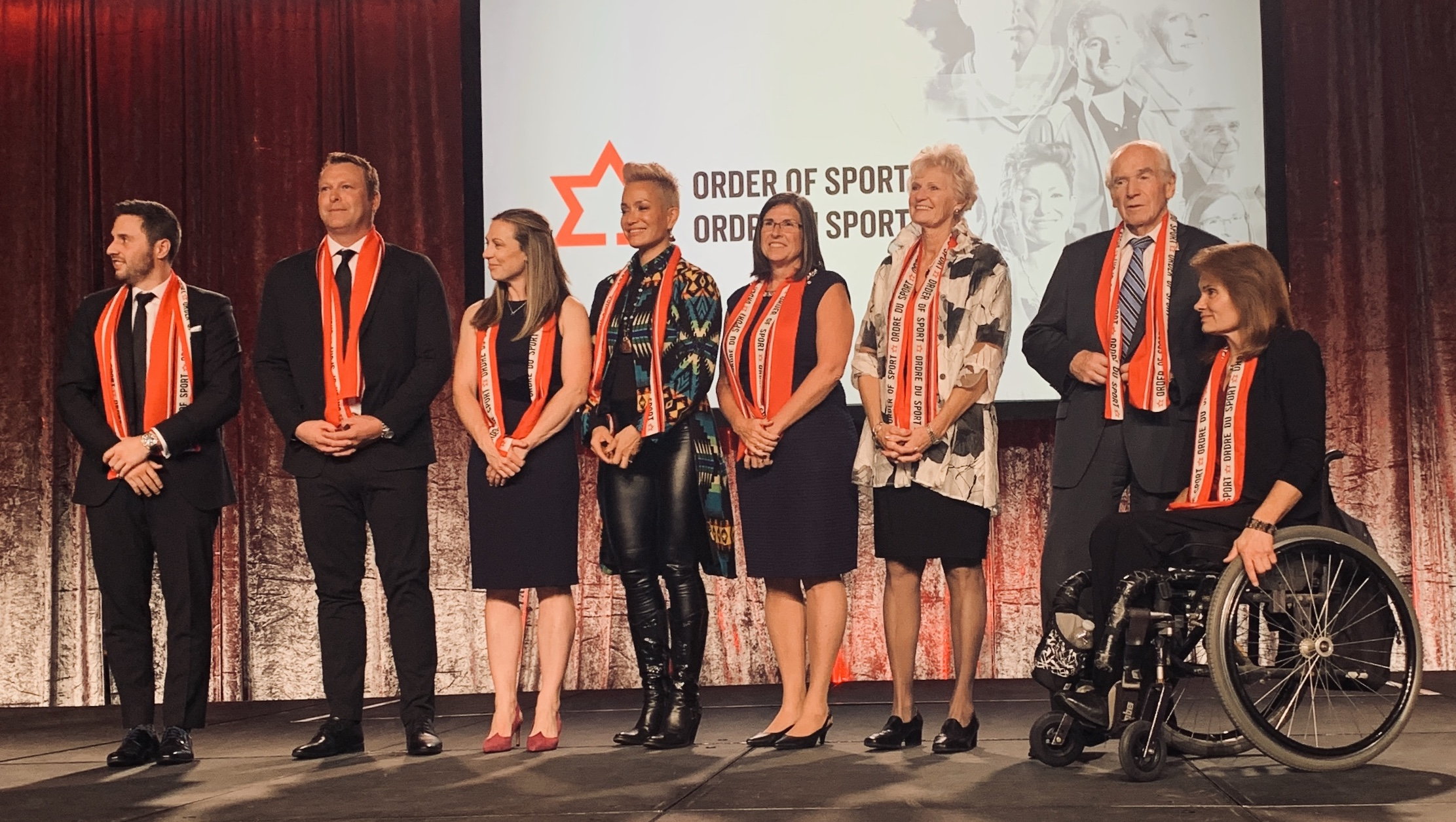
2019 Inaugural Order of Sport - Canada's Sports Hall of Fame

The Order of Sport is a national level award established in 2019 by Canada's Sports Hall of Fame. It is awarded alongside induction into Canada's Sports Hall of Fame, and regarded as Canada's highest sporting honour.

== Overview ==
Canada’s Sports Hall of Fame was established in 1955 as a recognition program and a historical archive of sport in Canada. The award is a symbol of the organization's purpose to build Canada through the transformative power of sport. Canada's Sports Hall of Fame created the Order of Sport award to modernize recognition and reflect the growing cultural significance of sport to Canadians; one that connects Canada's greatest sports champions to the greater good.

In October 2019, Canada's Sports Hall of Fame presented the inaugural Order of Sport Award to the class of 2019; six athletes and two builders were awarded the Order of Sport.

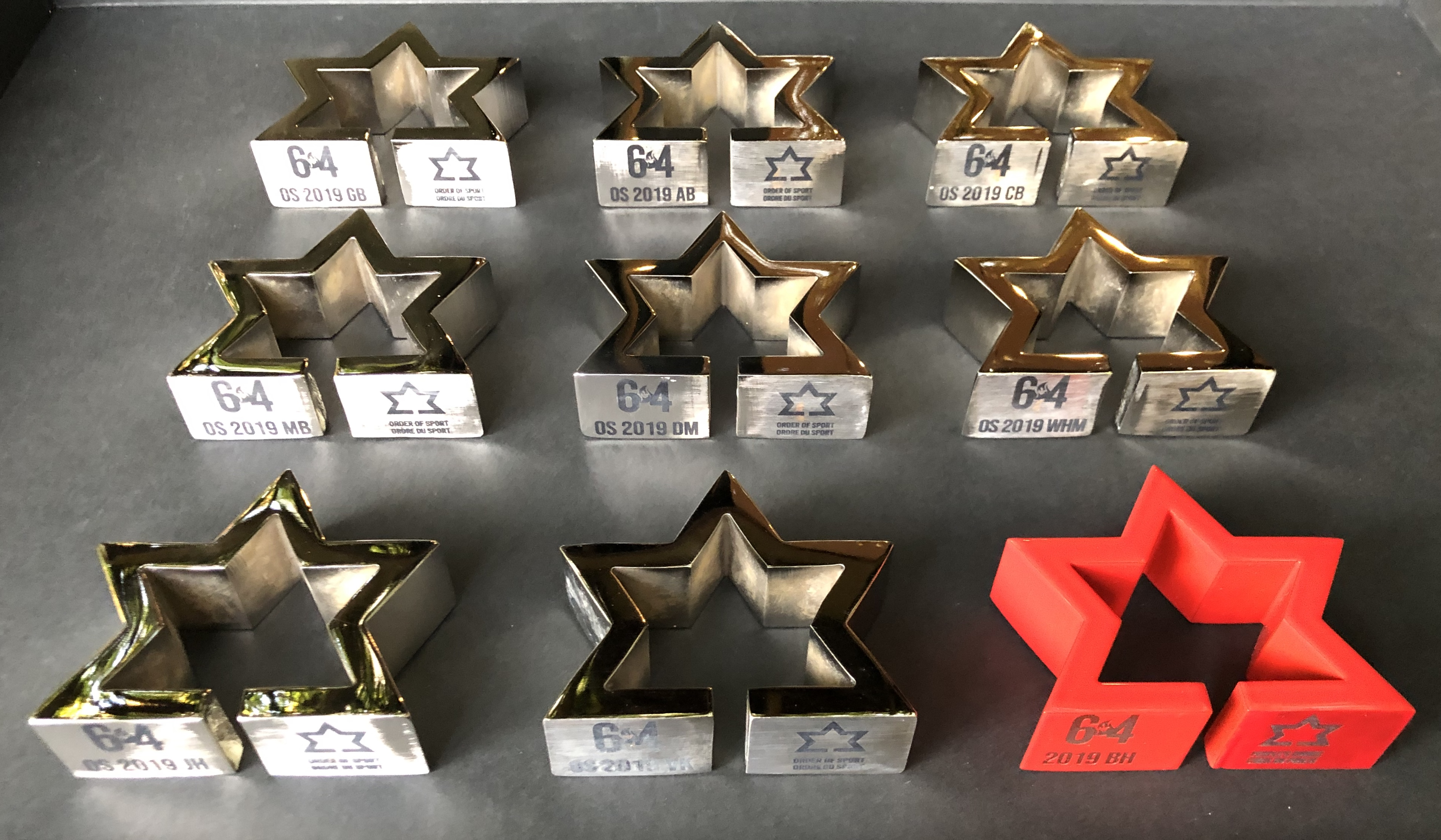
Order of Sport Inaugural Award (2019) - inscribed with recipients initials and date

== Order of Sport Symbol ==
The Order of Sport symbol represents the broader and open-ended social purpose of Sports in Canada reflecting the growing cultural significance of sport to Canadians; one that connects Canada’s greatest sports champions to the greater good. Based on the 1967 Centennial design work of Stuart Ash, Design Canada film maker and graphic designer Greg Durrell's Order of Sport logo represents the unifying power of sport for Canadians.

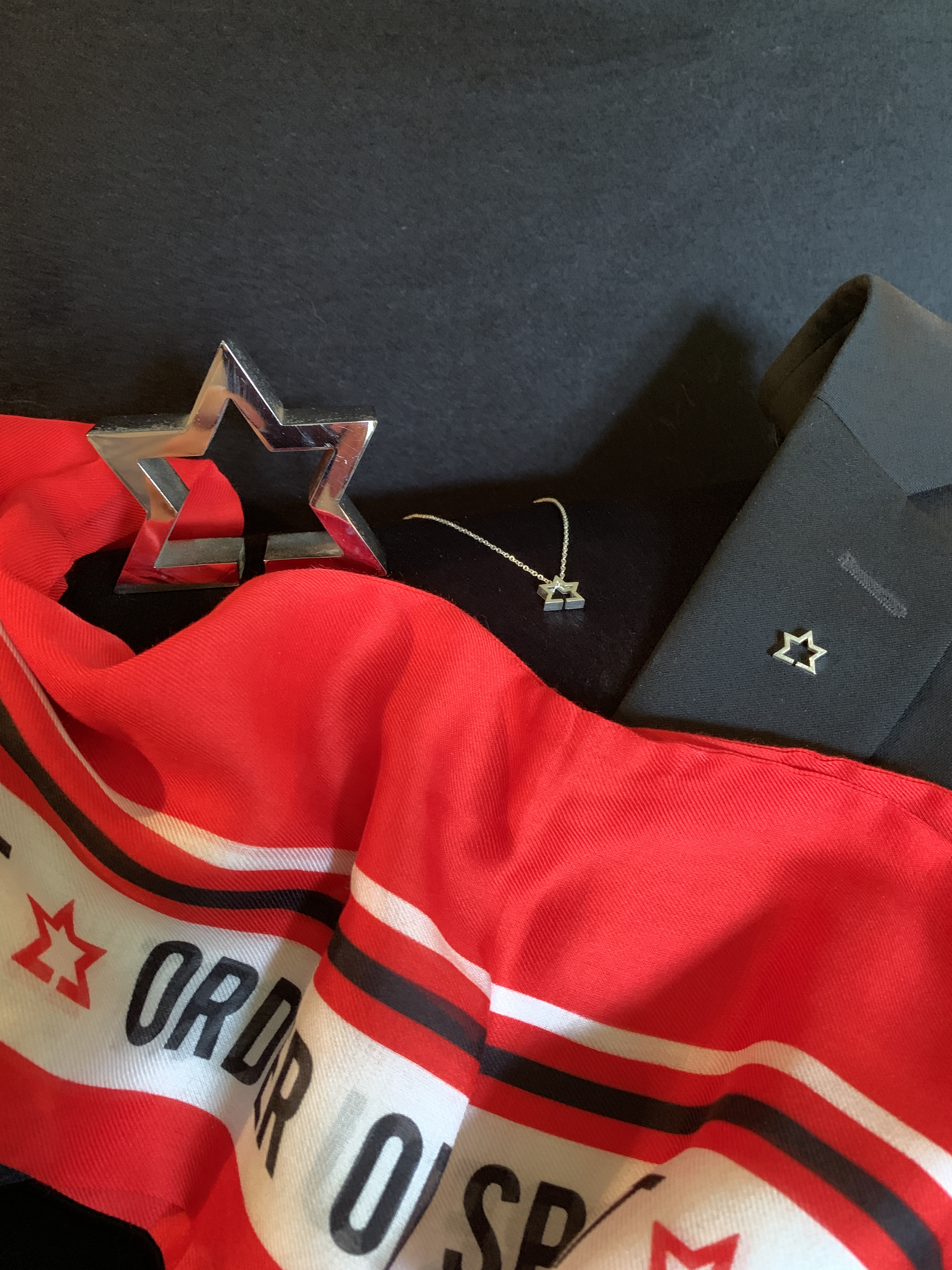
Order of Sport Award, Pin, Pendant and Scarf

== Order of Sport regalia ==
The recipients of the Order of Sport are recognized with the Order of Sport typographic scarf, a trophy, pin or pendant.
