= List of Grey Cup–winning head coaches =

This is a list of Grey Cup winning head coaches.

Grey Cup	Coach	Team	Opponent (Head coach)	Score	Host city
113th	Mark Kilam	Edmonton Elks	Montreal Alouettes (Jason Maas	37–30	Calgary
112th	Corey Mace	Saskatchewan Roughriders	Montreal Alouettes (Jason Maas)	25–17	Winnipeg
111th	Ryan Dinwiddie (2)	Toronto Argonauts	Winnipeg Blue Bombers (Mike O'Shea)	41–24	Vancouver
110th	Jason Maas	Montreal Alouettes	Winnipeg Blue Bombers (Mike O'Shea)	28–24	Hamilton
109th	Ryan Dinwiddie	Toronto Argonauts	Winnipeg Blue Bombers (Mike O'Shea)	24–23	Regina
108th	Mike O'Shea (2)	Winnipeg Blue Bombers	Hamilton Tiger-Cats (Orlondo Steinauer)	33–25	Hamilton
107th	Mike O'Shea	Winnipeg Blue Bombers	Hamilton Tiger-Cats (Orlondo Steinauer)	33–12	Calgary
106th	Dave Dickenson	Calgary Stampeders	Ottawa Redblacks (Rick Campbell)	27–16	Edmonton
105th	Marc Trestman (3)	Toronto Argonauts	Calgary Stampeders (Dave Dickenson)	27–24	Ottawa
104th	Rick Campbell	Ottawa Redblacks	Calgary Stampeders (Dave Dickenson)	39–33	Toronto
103rd	Chris Jones	Edmonton Eskimos	Ottawa Redblacks (Rick Campbell)	26–20	Winnipeg
102nd	John Hufnagel (2)	Calgary Stampeders	Hamilton Tiger-Cats (Kent Austin)	20–16	Vancouver
101st	Corey Chamblin	Saskatchewan Roughriders	Hamilton Tiger-Cats (Kent Austin)	45–23	Regina
100th	Scott Milanovich	Toronto Argonauts	Calgary Stampeders (John Hufnagel)	35–22	Toronto
99th	Wally Buono (5)	BC Lions	Winnipeg Blue Bombers (Paul LaPolice)	34–23	Vancouver
98th	Marc Trestman (2)	Montreal Alouettes	Saskatchewan Roughriders (Ken Miller)	21–18	Edmonton
97th	Marc Trestman	Montreal Alouettes	Saskatchewan Roughriders (Ken Miller)	28–27	Calgary
96th	John Hufnagel	Calgary Stampeders	Montreal Alouettes (Marc Trestman)	22–14	Montreal
95th	Kent Austin	Saskatchewan Roughriders	Winnipeg Blue Bombers (Doug Berry)	23–19	Toronto
94th	Wally Buono (4)	British Columbia Lions	Montreal Alouettes (Jim Popp)	25–14	Winnipeg
93rd	Danny Maciocia	Edmonton Eskimos	Montreal Alouettes (Don Matthews)	38–35	Vancouver
92nd	Pinball Clemons	Toronto Argonauts	British Columbia Lions (Wally Buono)	27–19	Ottawa
91st	Tom Higgins	Edmonton Eskimos	Montreal Alouettes (Don Matthews)	34–22	Regina
90th	Don Matthews (5)	Montreal Alouettes	Edmonton Eskimos (Tom Higgins)	25–16	Edmonton
89th	Wally Buono (3)	Calgary Stampeders	Winnipeg Blue Bombers (Dave Ritchie)	27–19	Montreal
88th	Steve Buratto	British Columbia Lions	Montreal Alouettes (Charlie Taaffe)	28–26	Calgary
87th	Ron Lancaster (2)	Hamilton Tiger-Cats	Calgary Stampeders (Wally Buono)	32–21	Vancouver
86th	Wally Buono (2)	Calgary Stampeders	Hamilton Tiger-Cats (Ron Lancaster)	26–24	Winnipeg
85th	Don Matthews (4)	Toronto Argonauts	Saskatchewan Roughriders (Jim Daley)	47–23	Edmonton
84th	Don Matthews (3)	Toronto Argonauts	Edmonton Eskimos (Ron Lancaster)	43–27	Hamilton
83rd	Don Matthews (2)	Baltimore Stallions	Calgary Stampeders (Wally Buono)	37–20	Regina
82nd	Dave Ritchie	British Columbia Lions	Baltimore CFLers (Don Matthews)	26–23	Vancouver
81st	Ron Lancaster	Edmonton Eskimos	Winnipeg Blue Bombers (Cal Murphy)	33–23	Calgary
80th	Wally Buono	Calgary Stampeders	Winnipeg Blue Bombers (Cal Murphy)	24–10	Toronto
79th	Adam Rita	Toronto Argonauts	Calgary Stampeders (Wally Buono)	36–21	Winnipeg
78th	Mike Riley (2)	Winnipeg Blue Bombers	Edmonton Eskimos (Joe Faragalli)	50–11	Vancouver
77th	John Gregory	Saskatchewan Roughriders	Hamilton Tiger-Cats (Al Bruno)	43–40	Toronto
76th	Mike Riley	Winnipeg Blue Bombers	British Columbia Lions (Larry Donovan)	22–21	Ottawa
75th	Joe Faragalli	Edmonton Eskimos	Toronto Argonauts (Bob O'Billovich)	38–36	Vancouver
74th	Al Bruno	Hamilton Tiger-Cats	Edmonton Eskimos (Jackie Parker)	39–15	Vancouver
73rd	Don Matthews	British Columbia Lions	Hamilton Tiger-Cats (Al Bruno)	37–24	Montreal
72nd	Cal Murphy	Winnipeg Blue Bombers	Hamilton Tiger-Cats (Al Bruno)	47–17	Edmonton
71st	Bob O'Billovich	Toronto Argonauts	British Columbia Lions (Don Matthews)	18–17	Vancouver
70th	Hugh Campbell (5)	Edmonton Eskimos	Toronto Argonauts (Bob O'Billovich)	32–16	Toronto
69th	Hugh Campbell (4)	Edmonton Eskimos	Ottawa Rough Riders (George Brancato)	26–23	Toronto
68th	Hugh Campbell (3)	Edmonton Eskimos	Hamilton Tiger-Cats (George Brancato)	48–10	Toronto
67th	Hugh Campbell (2)	Edmonton Eskimos	Montreal Alouettes (Joe Scannella)	17–9	Montreal
66th	Hugh Campbell	Edmonton Eskimos	Montreal Alouettes (Joe Scannella)	20–13	Toronto
65th	Marv Levy (2)	Montreal Alouettes	Edmonton Eskimos (Hugh Campbell)	41–6	Montreal
64th	George Brancato	Ottawa Rough Riders	Saskatchewan Roughriders (John Payne)	23–20	Toronto
63rd	Ray Jauch	Edmonton Eskimos	Montreal Alouettes (Marv Levy)	9–8	Calgary
62nd	Marv Levy	Montreal Alouettes	Edmonton Eskimos (Ray Jauch)	20–7	Vancouver
61st	Jack Gotta	Ottawa Rough Riders	Edmonton Eskimos (Ray Jauch)	22–18	Toronto
60th	Jerry Williams	Hamilton Tiger-Cats	Saskatchewan Roughriders (Dave Skrien)	13–10	Hamilton
59th	Jim Duncan	Calgary Stampeders	Toronto Argonauts (Leo Cahill)	14–11	Vancouver
58th	Sam Etcheverry	Montreal Alouettes	Calgary Stampeders (Jim Duncan)	23–10	Toronto
57th	Frank Clair (5)	Ottawa Rough Riders	Saskatchewan Roughriders (Eagle Keys)	29–11	Montreal
56th	Frank Clair (4)	Ottawa Rough Riders	Calgary Stampeders (Jerry Williams)	24–21	Toronto
55th	Ralph Sazio (3)	Hamilton Tiger-Cats	Saskatchewan Roughriders (Eagle Keys)	24–1	Ottawa
54th	Eagle Keys	Saskatchewan Roughriders	Ottawa Rough Riders (Frank Clair)	29–14	Vancouver
53rd	Ralph Sazio (2)	Hamilton Tiger-Cats	Winnipeg Blue Bombers (Bud Grant)	22–16	Toronto
52nd	Dave Skrien	B.C. Lions	Hamilton Tiger-Cats (Ralph Sazio)	34–24	Toronto
51st	Ralph Sazio	Hamilton Tiger-Cats	B.C. Lions (Dave Skrien)	21–10	Vancouver
50th	Bud Grant (4)	Winnipeg Blue Bombers	Hamilton Tiger-Cats (Jim Trimble)	28–27	Toronto
49th	Bud Grant (3)	Winnipeg Blue Bombers	Hamilton Tiger-Cats (Jim Trimble)	21–24	Toronto
48th	Frank Clair (3)	Ottawa Rough Riders	Edmonton Eskimos (Eagle Keys)	16–6	Vancouver
47th	Bud Grant (2)	Winnipeg Blue Bombers	Hamilton Tiger-Cats (Jim Trimble)	21–7	Toronto
46th	Bud Grant	Winnipeg Blue Bombers	Hamilton Tiger-Cats (Jim Trimble)	35–28	Vancouver
45th	Jim Trimble	Hamilton Tiger-Cats	Winnipeg Blue Bombers (Bud Grant)	32–7	Toronto
44th	Pop Ivy (3)	Edmonton Eskimos	Montreal Alouettes (Peahead Walker)	50–27	Toronto
43rd	Pop Ivy (2)	Edmonton Eskimos	Montreal Alouettes (Peahead Walker)	34–19	Vancouver
42nd	Pop Ivy	Edmonton Eskimos	Montreal Alouettes (Peahead Walker)	26–25	Toronto
41st	Carl M. Voyles	Hamilton Tiger-Cats	Winnipeg Blue Bombers (George Trafton)	12–6	Toronto
40th	Frank Clair (2)	Toronto Argonauts	Edmonton Eskimos (Frank Filchock)	21–11	Toronto
39th	Clem Crowe	Ottawa Rough Riders	Saskatchewan Roughriders (Harry Smith)	21–14	Toronto
38th	Frank Clair	Toronto Argonauts	Winnipeg Blue Bombers (Frank Larson)	13–0	Toronto
37th	Lew Hayman (5)	Montreal Alouettes	Calgary Stampeders (Les Lear)	28–15	Toronto
36th	Les Lear	Calgary Stampeders	Ottawa Rough Riders (Walt Masters)	12–7	Toronto
35th	Teddy Morris (3)	Toronto Argonauts	Winnipeg Blue Bombers (Jack West)	10–9	Toronto
34th	Teddy Morris (2)	Toronto Argonauts	Winnipeg Blue Bombers (Jack West)	28–6	Toronto
33rd	Teddy Morris	Toronto Argonauts	Winnipeg Blue Bombers (Bert Warwick)	35–0	Toronto
32nd	Glen Brown	St. Hyacinthe-Donnacona Navy	Hamilton Flying Wildcats (Eddie McLean)	7–6	Hamilton
31st	Brian Timmis	Hamilton Flying Wildcats	Winnipeg RCAF Bombers (Red Threlfall)	23–14	Toronto
30th	Lew Hayman (4)	Toronto RCAF Hurricanes	Winnipeg RCAF Bombers (Red Threlfall)	8–5	Toronto
29th	Red Threlfall (2)	Winnipeg Blue Bombers	Ottawa Rough Riders (Ross Trimble)	18–16	Toronto
28th	Ross Trimble	Ottawa Rough Riders	Toronto Balmy Beach Beachers (Alex Ponton)	8–2 12–5	Toronto Ottawa
27th	Red Threlfall	Winnipeg Blue Bombers	Ottawa Rough Riders (Ross Trimble)	8–7	Ottawa
26th	Lew Hayman (3)	Toronto Argonauts	Winnipeg Blue Bombers (Red Threlfall)	30–7	Toronto
25th	Lew Hayman (2)	Toronto Argonauts	Winnipeg Blue Bombers (Red Threlfall)	4–3	Toronto
24th	Art Massucci (2)	Sarnia Imperials	Ottawa Rough Riders (Billy Hughes)	26–20	Toronto
23rd	Bob Fritz	Winnipeg 'Pegs	Hamilton Tigers (Fred Veale)	18–12	Hamilton
22nd	Art Massucci	Sarnia Imperials	Regina Roughriders (Greg Gassick)	20–12	Toronto
21st	Lew Hayman	Toronto Argonauts	Sarnia Imperials (Pat Quellette)	4–3	Sarnia
20th	Billy Hughes (4)	Hamilton Tigers	Regina Roughriders (Al Ritchie)	25–6	Hamilton
19th	Clary Foran	Montreal AAA Winged Wheelers	Regina Roughriders (Al Ritchie)	22–0	Montreal
18th	Alex Ponton	Toronto Balmy Beach Beachers	Regina Roughriders (Al Ritchie)	11–6	Toronto
17th	Mike Rodden (2)	Hamilton Tigers	Regina Roughriders (Al Ritchie)	14–3	Hamilton
16th	Mike Rodden	Hamilton Tigers	Regina Roughriders (Al Ritchie)	30–0	Hamilton
15th	Harry Hobbs	Toronto Balmy Beach Beachers	Hamilton Tigers (Mike Rodden)	9–6	Toronto
14th	Dave McCann (2)	Ottawa Senators	Toronto Varsity Blues (Ron McPherson)	10–7	Toronto
13th	Dave McCann	Ottawa Senators	Winnipeg Tammany Tigers (Harold Roth)	24–1	Ottawa
12th	Billy Hughes (3)	Queen's University	Toronto Balmy Beach Beachers (A. Rodden & A. Buett)	11–2	Toronto
11th	Billy Hughes (2)	Queen's University	Regina Roughriders (Jack Eadie)	54–0	Toronto
10th	Billy Hughes	Queen's University	Edmonton Elks (William "Deacon" White)	13–1	Kingston
9th	Sinc McEvenue	Toronto Argonauts	Edmonton Eskimos (William "Deacon" White)	23–0	Toronto
8th	Laddie Cassels	University of Toronto	Toronto Argonauts (Mike Rodden)	16–3	Toronto
7th	Liz Marriott (3)	Hamilton Tigers	Toronto Rowing and Athletic Association (Ed Livingstone)	13–7	Toronto
6th	Billy Foulds	Toronto Argonauts	University of Toronto (Hugh Gall)	14–2	Toronto
5th	Liz Marriott (2)	Hamilton Tigers	Toronto Parkdale Canoe Club (Ed Livingstone)	44–2	Hamilton
4th	Liz Marriott	Hamilton Alerts	University of Toronto (Jack Newton)	11–4	Hamilton
3rd	A.B. Wright	University of Toronto	Toronto Argonauts (Billy Foulds)	14–7	Toronto
2nd	Harry Griffith (2)	University of Toronto	Hamilton Tigers (Seppi DuMoulin)	16–7	Hamilton
1st	Harry Griffith	University of Toronto	Toronto Parkdale Canoe Club (Ed Livingstone)	26–6	Toronto

Head coaches with multiple Grey Cup wins

Head coach	Wins	Years won	Team(s)
Lew Hayman	5	1933, 1937, 1938, 1942, 1949	Toronto Argonauts, Toronto RCAF Hurricanes, Montreal Alouettes
Frank Clair	5	1950, 1952, 1960, 1968, 1969	Toronto Argonauts, Ottawa Roughriders
Hugh Campbell	5	1978, 1979, 1980, 1981, 1982	Edmonton Eskimos
Don Matthews	5	1985, 1995, 1996, 1997, 2002	BC Lions, Baltimore Stallions, Toronto Argonauts, Montreal Alouettes
Wally Buono	5	1992, 1998, 2001, 2006, 2011	Calgary Stampeders, BC Lions
Billy Hughes	4	1922, 1923, 1924, 1932	Queen's University, Hamilton Tigers
Bud Grant	4	1958, 1959, 1961, 1962	Winnipeg Blue Bombers
Liz Marriott	3	1912, 1913, 1915	Hamilton Alerts, Hamilton Tigers
Teddy Morris	3	1945, 1946, 1947	Toronto Argonauts
Pop Ivy	3	1954, 1955, 1956	Edmonton Eskimos
Ralph Sazio	3	1963, 1965, 1967	Hamilton Tiger-Cats
Marc Trestman	3	2009, 2010, 2017	Montreal Alouettes,Toronto Argonauts
Harry Griffith	2	1909, 1910	University of Toronto
Dave McCann	2	1925, 1926	Ottawa Senators
Mike Rodden	2	1928, 1929	Hamilton Tigers
Art Massucci	2	1934, 1936	Sarnia Imperials
Red Threlfall	2	1939, 1941	Winnipeg Blue Bombers
Marv Levy	2	1974, 1977	Montreal Alouettes
Mike Riley	2	1988, 1990	Winnipeg Blue Bombers
Ron Lancaster	2	1993, 1999	Edmonton Eskimos, Hamilton Tiger-Cats
John Hufnagel	2	2008, 2014	Calgary Stampeders
Mike O'Shea	2	2019, 2021	Winnipeg Blue Bombers
Ryan Dinwiddie	2	2022, 2024	Toronto Argonauts
