= List of Toronto Argonauts head coaches =

The Toronto Argonauts are a professional Canadian football team based in Toronto, Ontario, and play in the East Division in the Canadian Football League (CFL).

The franchise was founded as in 1873 and was a founding member of the Ontario Rugby Football Union in 1883 and of the Interprovincial Rugby Football Union in 1907. In its long history, the team has won a record 19 championships and been led by 59 head coaches. The Argonauts head coach is Mike Miller, the general manager is Michael Clemons and the owner is Maple Leaf Sports & Entertainment.

== Key ==
Symbol	Description
GC	Games coached
W	Wins
L	Losses
T	Ties
W%	Winning percentage^{[b]}
PGC	Playoff games coached
PW	Playoff wins
PL	Playoff losses
PW%	Playoff winning percentage
†	Elected to the Canadian Football Hall of Fame in the builders category

== Head coaches ==
Note: Statistics are current through the end of the 2026 CFL season.

#	Name^{[a]}	Term^{[b]}	GC	W	L	T	W%	PGC	PW	PL	PW%	Achievements
1	H. T. Glazebrook	1873–1874						—	—	—	—	
2	Harold Lambe	1875						—	—	—	—	
3	W. H. Perram	1876–1877						—	—	—	—	
4	Bedford	1878						—	—	—	—	
5	Orville Murphy	1880–1881						—	—	—	—	
6	Hume Blake (1st stint)	1882						—	—	—	—	
7	A. H. Campbell	1883						—	—	—	—	
-	Hume Blake (2nd stint)	1884						—	—	—	—	
8	Rupert Muntz	1885–1886						—	—	—	—	
9	Hugh Smith	1887–1890						—	—	—	—	
10	R. Bayley	1891–892						—	—	—	—	
11	Billy Wood	1893						—	—	—	—	
12	Joe Wright, Sr.	1894–1900						—	—	—	—	
14	Pud Kent	1901–1903						—	—	—	—	
15	Fred Thompson	1904–1905						—	—	—	—	
16	Chaucer Elliott (1st stint)	1906	6	4	2	0	.667	—	—	—	—	
17	Fred Russell/Art Kent	1907–1909	18	3	15	0	.167	—	—	—	—	
-	Chaucer Elliott (2nd stint)	1910	6	3	3	0	.500	—	—	—	—	
18	Billy Foulds† (1st stint)	1911	6	5	1	0	.833	2	1	1	.500	
19	Jack Newton†	1912	6	5	1	0	.833	2	1	1	.500	
20	Ross Binkley	1913	6	3	3	0	.500	—	—	—	—	
-	Billy Foulds† (2nd stint)	1914	6	5	1	0	.833	3	3	0	1.000	6th Grey Cup championship
21	Billy Foulds† (2nd stint)/Warren Coryell	1915	6	4	2	0	.667	—	—	—	—	
22	Sinc McEvenue (1st stint)	1919	6	3	3	0	.500	—	—	—	—	
23	Mike Rodden† (1st stint)	1920	6	5	1	0	.833	2	1	1	.500	
-	Sinc McEvenue (2nd stint)	1921	6	6	0	0	1.000	3	3	0	1.000	9th Grey Cup championship
24	Jack O'Connor	1922–1925	24	14	7	3	.646	2	1	1	.500	
-	Mike Rodden† (2nd stint)	1926	6	3	3	0	.500	—	—	—	—	
25	Frank Knight	1927–1928	12	3	7	2	.333	—	—	—	—	
26	Buck McKenna	1929–1932	24	13	10	1	.563	—	—	—	—	
27	Lew Hayman†	1933–1941	57	40	15	2	.719	20	12	8	.600	21st Grey Cup championship 25th Grey Cup championship 26th Grey Cup championship
28	Ted Morris	1945–1949	54	29	21	4	.574	11	10	1	.909	33rd Grey Cup championship 34th Grey Cup championship 35th Grey Cup championship
29	Frank Clair†	1950–1954	64	31	31	2	.500	11	8	3	.727	38th Grey Cup championship 40th Grey Cup championship
30	Bill Swiacki	1955–1956	26	8	10	0	.444	2	1	1	.500	
31	Hamp Pool	1957–1959	32	9	23	0	.281	—	—	—	—	
32	Steve Owen	1959	10	3	7	0	.500	—	—	—	—	
33	Lou Agase	1960–1962	31	17	13	1	.565	5	2	3	.400	
34	Nobby Wirkowski	1962–1964	39	11	28	0	.282	—	—	—	—	
35	Bob Shaw	1965–1966	28	8	20	0	.286	—	—	—	—	
36	Leo Cahill (1st stint)	1967–1972	84	45	38	1	.542	10	6	4	.400	1971 Annis Stukus Trophy winner
37	John Rauch	1973–1974	21	10	9	2	.524	1	0	1	.000	
38	Joe Moss	1974	9	3	5	1	.389	—	—	—	—	
39	Russ Jackson	1975–1976	32	12	18	2	.406	—	—	—	—	
-	Leo Cahill (2nd stint)	1977–1978	25	9	16	0	.360	1	0	1	.000	
40	Bud Riley	1978	7	1	6	0	.143	—	—	—	—	
41	Forrest Gregg	1979	16	5	11	0	.313	—	—	—	—	
42	Willie Wood	1980–1981	26	6	20	0	.231	—	—	—	—	
43	Tommy Hudspeth	1981	6	2	4	0	.333	—	—	—	—	
44	Bob O'Billovich† (1st stint)	1982–1989	136	78	55	3	.585	12	6	6	.500	1982 Annis Stukus Trophy winner 1987 Annis Stukus Trophy winner 71st Grey Cup championship
45	Don Matthews† (1st stint)	1990	18	10	8	0	.556	2	1	1	.500	
46	Adam Rita	1991–1992	29	16	13	0	.552	2	2	0	1.000	1991 Annis Stukus Trophy winner 79th Grey Cup championship
47	Dennis Meyer	1992–1993	17	4	13	0	.235	—	—	—	—	
-	Bob O'Billovich† (2nd stint)	1993–1994	26	9	17	0	.346	1	0	1	.000	
48	Mike Faragalli	1995	9	2	7	0	.222	—	—	—	—	
-	Bob O'Billovich† (3rd stint)	1995	9	2	7	0	.222	—	—	—	—	
-	Don Matthews† (2nd stint)	1996–1998	54	39	15	0	.722	5	4	1	.800	1997 Annis Stukus Trophy winner 84th Grey Cup championship 85th Grey Cup championship
49	Jim Barker (1st stint)	1999	18	9	9	0	.500	1	0	1	.000	
50	John Huard	2000	8	1	6	1	.189	—	—	—	—	
51	Wally Highsmith (interim)	2000	2	1	1	0	.500	—	—	—	—	
52	Michael Clemons (1st stint)	2000–2001	26	12	14	0	.462	—	—	—	—	
53	Gary Etcheverry	2002	12	4	8	0	.333	—	—	—	—	
	Michael Clemons (2nd stint)	2002–2007	96	55	40	1	.578	11	6	5	.545	92nd Grey Cup championship
54	Rich Stubler	2008	10	4	6	0	.400	—	—	—	—	
-	Don Matthews† (3rd stint)	2008	8	0	8	0	.000	—	—	—	—	
55	Bart Andrus	2009	18	3	15	0	.167	—	—	—	—	
-	Jim Barker (2nd stint)	2010–2011	36	15	21	0	.417	2	1	1	.500	2010 Annis Stukus Trophy winner
56	Scott Milanovich	2012–2016	90	43	47	0	.478	5	3	2	.600	2012 Annis Stukus Trophy winner 100th Grey Cup championship
57	Marc Trestman	2017–2018	36	13	23	0	.361	2	2	0	1.000	2017 Annis Stukus Trophy winner 105th Grey Cup championship
58	Corey Chamblin	2019	18	4	14	0	.286	—	—	—	—	
59	Ryan Dinwiddie	2020–2025	86	51	35	0	.630	7	5	2	.714	2023 Annis Stukus Trophy winner 109th Grey Cup championship 111th Grey Cup championship
60	Mike Miller	2026–present	18	9	9	0	.583	1	0	1	.000	

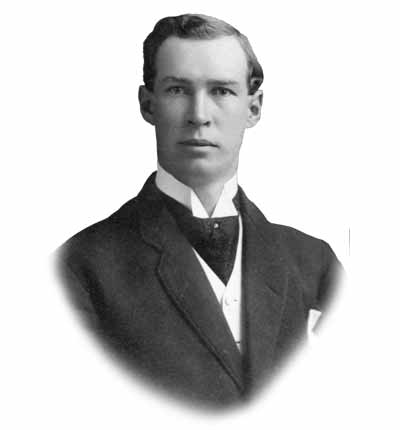
Chaucer Elliott coached for two stints with the Argonauts, including their last season in the ORFU in 1906.

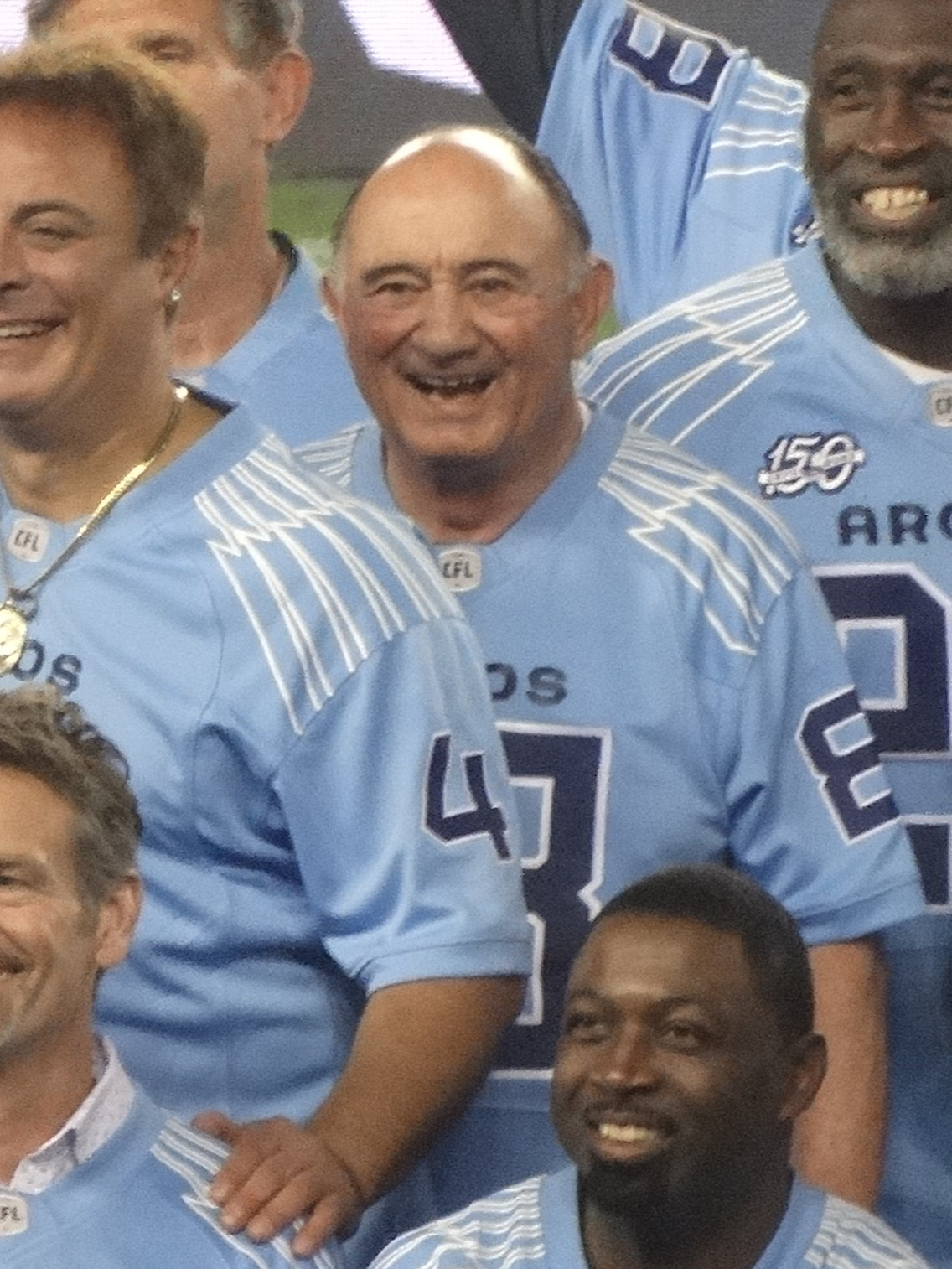
Bob O'Billovich has the most wins, with 89, and won the Grey Cup for the Argonauts in 1983.

Michael "Pinball" Clemons won the Grey Cup for the Argonauts in 2004.

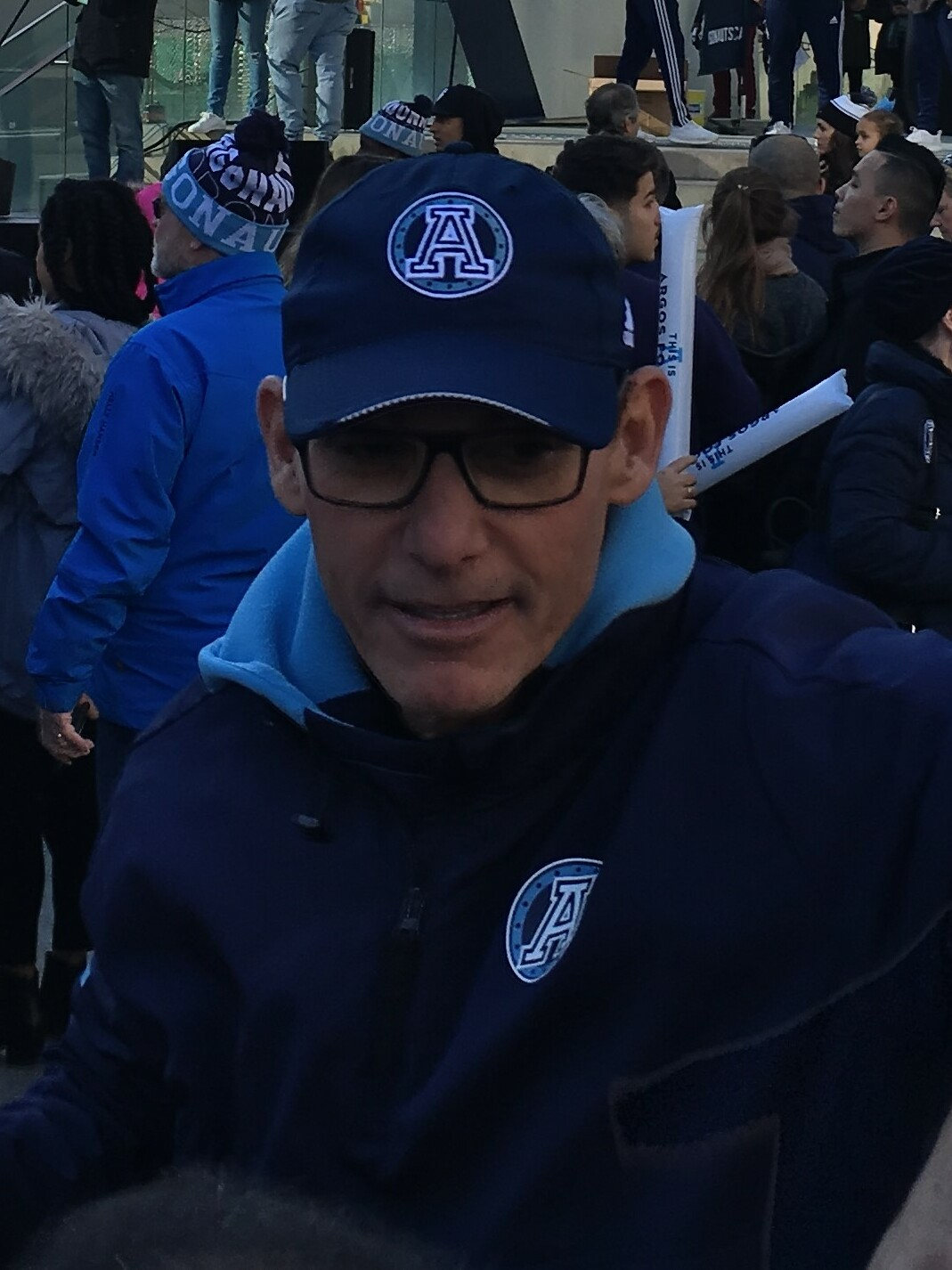
Marc Trestman won the 105th Grey Cup for the Argonauts.

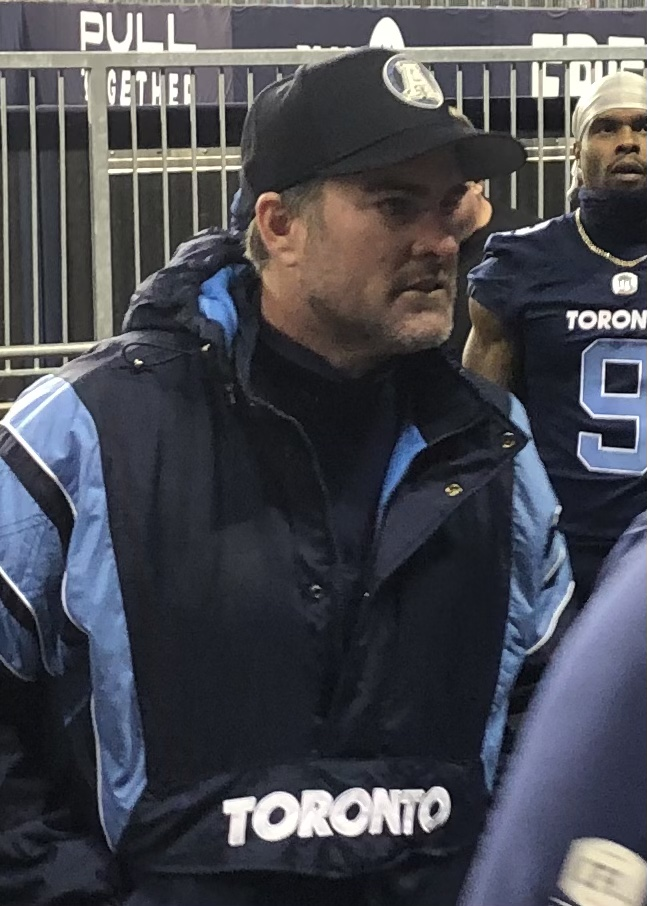
Ryan Dinwiddie won Grey Cups in 2022 and 2024.

== All-Time Records ==
=== Top 5 Coaches by Regular Season Wins ===
Rank	Coach	Wins
1	Bob O'Billovich	89
2	Michael "Pinball" Clemons	67
3	Leo Cahill	54
4	Ryan Dinwiddie	51
5	Don Matthews	49

=== Top 5 Coaches by Playoff Wins ===
Rank	Coach	Playoff Wins
1	Lew Hayman	12
2	Ted Morris	10
3	Frank Clair	8
T-4	Leo Cahill	6
T-4	Michael "Pinball" Clemons	6
T-4	Bob O'Billovich	6

=== Top 5 Coaches by Regular Season Games Coached ===
Rank	Coach	Games
1	Bob O'Billovich	171
2	Michael "Pinball" Clemons	122
3	Leo Cahill	109
4	Scott Milanovich	90
5	Ryan Dinwiddie	86

=== Top 5 Coaches by Playoff Games Coached ===
Rank	Coach	Games
1	Lew Hayman	20
2	Bob O'Billovich	13
T-3	Leo Cahill	11
T-3	Frank Clair	11
T-3	Michael "Pinball" Clemons	11
T-3	Ted Morris	11

=== Coaches with Grey Cup Championships ===
Coach	Grey Cup Championships	Year(s)
Ted Morris	3	1933, 1937, 1938
Lew Hayman	3	1945, 1946, 1947
Don Matthews	2	1996, 1997
Frank Clair	2	1950, 1952
Ryan Dinwiddie	2	2022, 2024
Michael "Pinball" Clemons	1	2004
Billy Foulds	1	1914
Scott Milanovich	1	2012
Sinc McEvenue	1	1921
Bob O'Billovich	1	1983
Adam Rita	1	1991
Marc Trestman	1	2017

=== Coaches with Coach of the Year Awards ===
Coach	Coach of the Year Awards	Year(s)
Bob O'Billovich	2	1982, 1987
Jim Barker	1	2010
Leo Cahill	1	1971
Ryan Dinwiddie	1	2023
Don Matthews	1	1997
Scott Milanovich	1	2012
Adam Rita	1	1991
Marc Trestman	1	2017

== Notes ==
- ^{a} A running total of the number of coaches of the Argonauts. Thus, any coach who has two or more separate terms as head coach is only counted once.
- ^{b} Entries prior to 1907 are taken from "Year-By-Year History" in the references. A consolidated list after 1907 is listed at "Toronto Argonauts All-Time Coaching."
