= Smirle Lawson =

Canadian gridiron football player (born 1888)

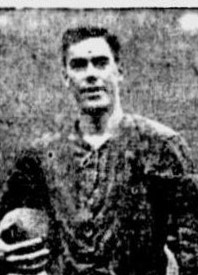
- Lawson with Toronto Varsity in 1909

Profile
- Position: Halfback

Personal information
- Born: March 19, 1887; Guelph, Ontario, Canada
- Died: December 22, 1963 (aged 75); Toronto, Ontario, Canada

Career information
- University: Toronto

Career history
- 1911–1914: Toronto Argonauts

Awards and highlights
- 2× Grey Cup champion (1909, 1914)
- Canadian Football Hall of Fame (Class of 1963)

Dr. Alexander Smirle Lawson (March 19, 1887 – December 22, 1963) was a Canadian football halfback who played for three years for Toronto Varsity and four years for the Toronto Argonauts. He was a two-time Grey Cup champion and an inaugural member of the Canadian Football Hall of Fame.

== Football career ==
Lawson played for the University of Toronto Varsity football team from 1907 to 1909. In 1909, Varsity finished with a 6–0 record and Lawson had two tries in the Dominion Semi-Final victory over the IRFU champion Ottawa Rough Riders. In the Dominion Championship, which was the first to be awarded the Grey Cup trophy, Lawson had a try and two singles as Varsity defeated the ORFU champion Toronto Parkdale. He graduated from the University of Toronto in the spring of 1910.

In 1911, Lawson joined the Toronto Argonauts. In his first year with the team, the Argonauts finished in first place in the IRFU and qualified for their first Dominion Championship game since 1901. In the 3rd Grey Cup, Lawson faced Toronto Varsity and many of his former teammates, but the Argonauts lost to Varsity 14–7.

In 1912, the Argonauts again finished as IRFU champions and qualified for their second consecutive Grey Cup game. However, Lawson was held in check and the Argonauts lost the 4th Grey Cup to the Hamilton Alerts.

After finishing in third place in 1913, the Argonauts returned as IRFU champions in 1914. In the 6th Grey Cup, Lawson's Argonauts faced his former team, Toronto Varsity. Although he was not in the starting lineup, Lawson became a Grey Cup champion once again as the Argonauts defeated Varsity 14–2.

== Post-playing career ==
Following the onset of the First World War in 1914, Lawson ended his football playing career and served as a medical officer in the war. Thereafter, he was a professor of surgery at the University of Toronto and also served on the staff of Toronto General Hospital. He was also Ontario's chief coroner from 1937 to 1962. As chief coroner, Lawson was friends with the Toronto police chief John C. Chisholm and the Justice Walter T. Robb, the chairman of the Ontario Liquor Licensing Board. Lawson came to be influenced by the gangster Johnny Papalia as the police informer Marvin Elkind recalled in 2011: "In those days, getting a liquor license was like printing money. Very few places had them. They were difficult to get and you had to get to Judge Robb. You just couldn't go to Judge Robb yourself and pay him off. You had to go through somebody...Smirle Lawson was one of his contacts. Charlie Conacher was one of his contracts. So if you wanted a liquor license in a bar or something, you would get to Judge Robb through these certain guys".

Lawson was inducted into the Canadian Football Hall of Fame in 1963 and into the Canada's Sports Hall of Fame in 1975. He died, aged 75, in Toronto, Ontario.

== Books ==
- Humphreys, Adrian (2011). The Weasel: A Double Life in the Mob. Toronto: John Wiley & Sons. ISBN 978-0470964514.
