= Jack Newton (Canadian football) =

Canadian gridiron football player (born 1887)

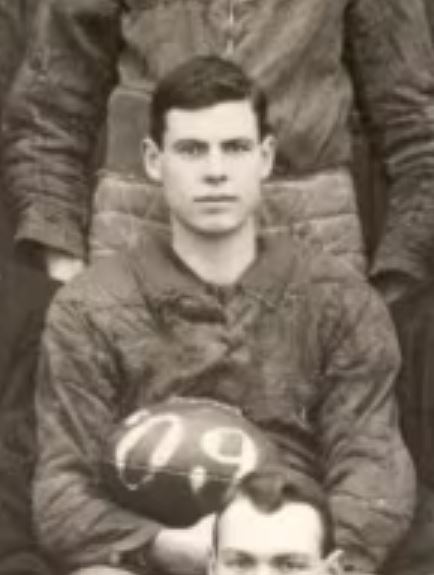
- Newton with Toronto Varsity in 1909

Profile
- Position: Halfback

Personal information
- Born: c. 1887; Limehouse, Ontario, Canada
- Died: December 24, 1967 (aged 80); Sarnia, Ontario, Canada

Career information
- High school: London Road High
- University: Toronto

Career history
- 1912: Toronto Argonauts (Head coach)
- 1913–1914: Toronto Argonauts (Assistant coach)
- 1915: Sarnia Intermediate (Head coach)
- 1919–1920: Sarnia Collegiate Institute (Head coach)
- 1921–1927: Sarnia Imperials Intermediate (Head coach)
- 1928–1930: Sarnia Imperials (Head coach)

Awards and highlights
- 2× Grey Cup champion (1909, 1914)
- Canadian Football Hall of Fame (Class of 1964)

John Newton (born c. 1887) was a Canadian football halfback who played for three years for Toronto Varsity and four years for the Toronto Argonauts. He was a two-time Grey Cup champion, once as a player and once as an assistant coach, and was inducted into the Canadian Football Hall of Fame.

== Early life ==
Newton was born in Limehouse, Ontario and moved to Sarnia when he was seven years old. He played football for the London Road High School team.

== Playing career ==
Newton played for the University of Toronto Varsity football team from 1907 to 1909. In 1908, he played in the 1908 Dominion Championship game at right half, but Varsity lost to the Hamilton Tigers.

In 1909, Varsity finished with a 6–0 record with Newton as team captain and he scored one try in the Dominion Semi-Final victory over the IRFU champion Ottawa Rough Riders. In the Dominion Championship, which was the first to be awarded the Grey Cup trophy, Varsity defeated the ORFU champion Toronto Parkdale 26–6 in the 1st Grey Cup.

== Coaching career ==
On August 30, 1912, Newton was named honorary coach of the Argonauts, but refused to be paid. In that season, Newton led the team to an IRFU championship and the team qualified for their second consecutive Grey Cup game. However, the Argonauts lost the 4th Grey Cup to the Hamilton Alerts. In 1913, Ross Binkley served as head coach while Newton remained in an assistant capacity.

Newton remained with the Argonauts in 1914 where they returned as IRFU champions. The Argonauts faced his former team, Toronto Varsity, in the 6th Grey Cup, where they defeated Varsity 14–2.

In 1915, Newton coached for the Sarnia Intermediate ORFU team. After serving in the First World War, he coached the Sarnia Collegiate Institute football team from 1919 to 1920. He then moved back to coaching the Sarnia Imperials Intermediate team until 1927.

In 1928, Newton led the Imperials' senior entry into the ORFU, which was their first year on the circuit. In their first season in the Senior ORFU, Newton led the Imperials to the ORFU title game, but they were defeated by the Toronto Orphans 6–0. In 1929, Newton coached the Imperials to a 6–0 record and ORFU Championship, but the team was defeated by the Hamilton Tigers in the East Semi-Final. In 1930, the Imperials finished second in their division and did not qualify for the championship game. He ceded the head coach position to Milt Burt, but remained with the Imperials in other capacities.

Newton was largely responsible for the growth of football in Sarnia which eventually led to the Imperials appearing in three Grey Cup games, winning twice. After the Imperials disbanded in 1940 near the start of World War II, Newton was the commanding officer of the Sarnia 2/26 Battery and subsequent entry into the ORFU.

== Post-playing career ==
Newton served in the First World War where he won the Military Cross as a member of the Canadian Field Artillery.

Newton was inducted into the Canadian Football Hall of Fame, as a builder, in November 1964. He died in Sarnia in December 1967.

== Personal life ==
Newton was married to Eleanor May Newton and they had two sons, John W. Newton and Frederick Newton.
