= Batstone =

Batstone is a surname. Notable people with the surname include:

- Chris Batstone (living), American musician with Suburban Legends
- David Batstone (born 1958), American ethics professor
- Harry Batstone (1899–1972), Canadian football player
- Joanna Batstone (living), British physics researcher and data scientist
- William Batstone (born 1961), American editor
