= Silver Quilty =

Canadian football player and sport administrator (1891–1976)

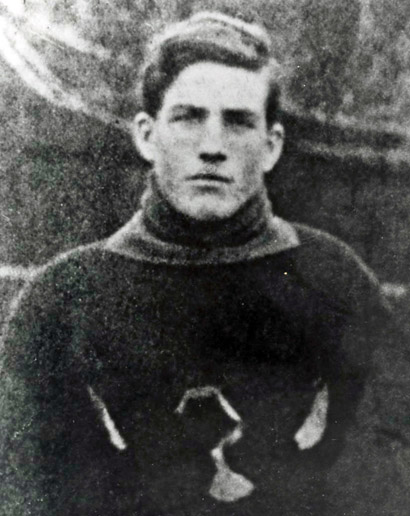
- Born: Sylvester Patrick Quilty; February 8, 1891; Renfrew County, Ontario, Canada
- Died: December 2, 1976 (aged 85); Ottawa, Ontario, Canada
- Resting place: Notre-Dame Cemetery, Ottawa
- Occupations: Insurance executive, civil servant
- Known for: Canadian Amateur Hockey Association and Ottawa District Hockey Association president
- Children: Johnny Quilty (son)
- Awards: Canada's Sports Hall of Fame; Ottawa Sport Hall of Fame
- Football career

Profile
- Position: Flying wing

Career information
- College: University of Ottawa; McGill University

Career history
- 1913: Ottawa Rough Riders

Awards and highlights
- 1907 Yates Cup champion
- Canadian Football Hall of Fame (Class of 1966)

Sylvester Patrick "Silver" Quilty (February 8, 1891 – December 2, 1976) was a Canadian football player, referee, coach and sport administrator. As a player, he won the Yates Cup in 1907 with the Ottawa Gee-Gees football team, and was credited as the first man to play the flying wing position. He also played with the Ottawa Rough Riders, and the McGill Redmen football team. After his playing career, he became a football referee and officiated the 10th Grey Cup, and also coached the Ottawa Rough Riders.

Quilty was later involved in building ice hockey in the Ottawa area, then served as president of the Canadian Amateur Hockey Association from 1924 to 1926. He sought to implement uniform playing rules across Canada, and helped bridge disagreements between the provincial hockey associations. He was the father of National Hockey League player Johnny Quilty, was inducted into the Canadian Football Hall of Fame in 1966, and into Canada's Sports Hall of Fame in 1975.

== Early life ==
Quilty was born February 8, 1891, near Renfrew, Ontario. He detested his birth name Sylvester, and preferred to be known as Silver. He began playing football while attending the Renfrew Collegiate Institute.

== Football playing career ==
At age 16, Quilty enrolled at the University of Ottawa, and joined the Ottawa Gee-Gees football team coached by Father William Stanton. Quilty went on to play with the Gee-Gees football team from 1907 to 1912. In the 1907 season, Quilty played the outside wing position on the team which won the intercollegiate football championship, and the 1907 Yates Cup title. In the 1908 season, Quilty became the first man to play in the flying wing position, when it was created by Father Stanton that season. Quilty was also the team's kicker and main ball carrier for the 1908 and 1909 seasons.

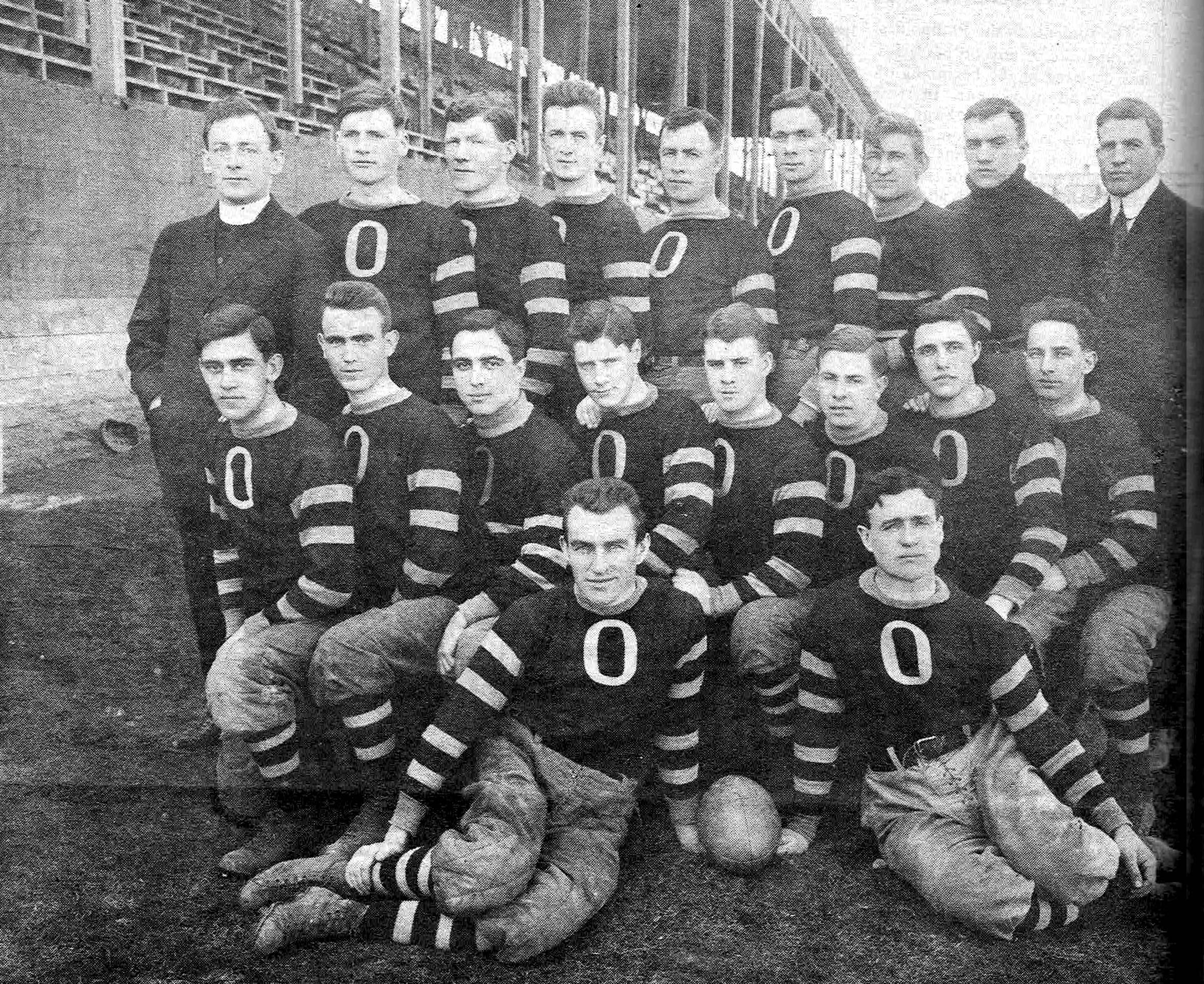
Quilty with the 1912 Ottawa Gee-Gees football team (top row, third from left)

Quilty served as the captain of the Ottawa team for the 1911 season. He graduated from University of Ottawa in 1912 with a Bachelor of Arts degree. On September 12, 1912, it was announced that Quilty would study to become a priest at the Montreal Seminary. On September 23, 1912, Quilty returned to play in Ottawa for the 1912 season, instead of studying at the seminary. Later that month, Queen's University denied a statement that it had offered Quilty free tuition to play for the Queen's Gaels football team.

Quilty played the 1913 season with the Ottawa Rough Riders under his old coach Father Stanton, but his team failed to reach the playoffs. He joined the McGill Redmen football team for the 1914 season, who were the defending intercollegiate champions. Quilty also enrolled at McGill University to study medicine. In the 1914 Yates Cup championship game, Quilty scored two touchdowns. The second touchdown included 109 yards gained in seven consecutive plays from his own one-yard line, but McGill lost the game to the Toronto Varsity Blues football team on a last-minute fumble in its end zone.

In 1912, the Winnipeg Free Press called Quilty "one of the greatest line plungers in the game". In 1930, The Globe and Mail said that. "in his playing days before the war, Quilty was the Lionel Conacher of his time". In a 1966 interview with The Canadian Press, Quilty recalled his playing days by saying, "we often used to make up our plays on the spur moment, right on the field during a game. The coach directed the team in practice and set up some basic plays but he didn't have much to do once a game started". Quilty also felt that modern football was more of a coaches' game, and said "but one thing hasn't changed with the years, to play football well you've got to have your heart in it".

== Later football career ==
Quilty worked as a Canadian football referee for five seasons after his playing days. He officiated football for two seasons with the Canadian Interuniversity Athletic Union (CIAU), and then three seasons with the Interprovincial Rugby Football Union (IRFU). He is credited with officiating one or two Grey Cup games depending on the source. The Canadian Press states that he was the referee in control of the 10th Grey Cup played in 1922, whereas an interview with Bob McKenzie specifically mentions that he refereed two Grey Cup games in the 1920s. Canada's Sports Hall of Fame credits him with occasional refereeing "well into the 1920s", and being requested by various teams.

Quilty also served on the rules committee for the CIAU and the IRFU. He later served as the president of a local Ottawa football organization.

Quilty coached the Ottawa St. Brigid's team in the Ontario Rugby Football Union from 1917 to 1919, then coached the Ottawa Rough Riders in the IRFU during the 1920 and 1923 seasons. Quilty chose to remain in a coaching role only, despite requests to be a player-coach.

Regular season statistics as a head coach
Year	Team	Division	Games	Won	Lost	Tied	Points for	Points against	Standing	Playoffs
1920	Ottawa Rough Riders	IRFU	6	3	3	0	49	52	3rd	n/a
1923	Ottawa Rough Riders	IRFU	6	1	5	0	54	60	4th	n/a
Totals			12	4	8	0	103	112		

== Hockey administrator ==
Quilty was the founding president of the Ottawa District Hockey Association (ODHA) in 1920, which soon affiliated with the national governing body, the Canadian Amateur Hockey Association (CAHA). He raised the profile of hockey in Eastern Ontario, and was a voice in favour of amateur hockey. He was subsequently elected vice-president of the CAHA, serving in that role from 1922 to 1924.

The Allan Cup was the championship trophy for amateur senior ice hockey in Canada.

Quilty succeeded Toby Sexsmith as president of the CAHA at the annual meeting in Toronto, on March 29, 1924. Quilty was immediately faced with branches of the CAHA resigning due to disagreements on rules of play, and set up a committee to look into uniform rules of play across Canada, in cooperation with the three existing professional leagues. The CAHA also examined whether to alter its practice of rotating hosting duties for the Allan Cup and Memorial Cup series between Eastern and Western Canada, depending on where the final series of the Stanley Cup was held in any given year. Other changes discussed included setting a deadline for provincial championships to be completed as part of inter-provincial playoffs; the adoption of the Ontario Hockey Association's protest policy as its own, and limiting the size of blades on hockey skates to be 14 inches. The CAHA also continued the practice of using profits from the Allan Cup playoffs to cover expenses of the Canada men's national ice hockey team.

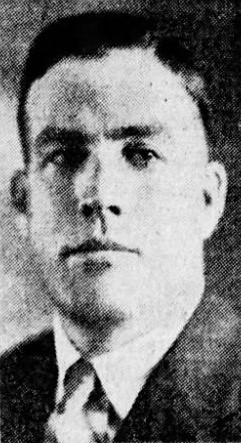
Quilty in 1924

In January 1925, Quilty appointed a special committee to review the amateur playing rules in the continued interest of uniformity and safety. In February 1925, he confirmed that the 1925 Allan Cup remained scheduled for Winnipeg, despite the 1925 Stanley Cup Finals being played in Western Canada. Quilty also confirmed that districts were voting on whether to make the Allan Cup final a best two-out-of-three series, or remain two-game total-goals series. Quilty announced Allan Cup and Abbott Cup schedules as a two-game series for 1925, but later switched the Allan Cup playoffs to a best-of-three series due to public demand. In March 1925, Quilty ordered an intermediate one-game playoff between Fort Frances and the Manitoba champion, but the Manitoba Association refused to play citing that no provision existed for inter-provincial intermediate playoffs.

Quilty was unanimously reelected president of the CAHA on March 25, 1925, at the annual general meeting held in the Fort Garry Hotel in Winnipeg. Also at the meeting, the CAHA agreed to award individual medals to team members of Allan Cup and Memorial Cup champions. The Allan Cup, and the J. Ross Robertson Cup series were changed to be a best-of-three series. The CAHA established the T. B. Patton Cup as the championship for Western Canada senior teams. Quilty and the CAHA were lauded at a banquet for progress made in working out the differences between east and west in Canadian amateur hockey.

The general meeting also saw the CAHA cancel its alliance with the United States Amateur Hockey Association (USAHA) due to persistent disagreements, but Quilty still allowed CAHA teams to play against American colleges not affiliated with the USAHA. The decision was consistent with a ruling earlier that month when Quilty approved exhibition games for Canadian teams against American high schools. The CAHA also updated residency rules, where a player must be a resident of the place he wishes to play in by May 15, and that player registrations must be filed with CAHA within 15 days of registration with the branch. The CAHA discussed uniformity of playing rules in co-operation with National Hockey League president Frank Calder. Proposed rule changes discussed included elimination of the offside rule at centre ice, substitution of players while game is in progress, allow kicking of the hockey puck, reduce the size of ice hockey goaltending equipment, and to allow only two defenders behind the blue line.

On March 18, 1926, Quilty declared a forfeit in the early rounds of the eastern Allan Cup playoffs in favour of the Ottawa Gunners from the Ottawa City Hockey League, when St. Francis Xavier of Montreal refused to play a sudden death game necessitated by time constraints caused due to delays in the previous round. Quilty was succeeded as the CAHA president on March 27, 1926, by Frank Sandercock from Calgary.

Quilty was the honorary president of the CAHA from 1926 to 1928. In that role, he was responsible to arrange the 1928 annual general meeting of the CAHA. He was also made an Allan Cup trustee after his term as CAHA president expired. In 1930, Quilty served on the executive of the Amateur Athletic Union of Canada, and was the chairman of its committee for affiliations and alliances for all amateur sports in Canada. In 1933, he received a medal from the CAHA as a past president.

== Personal life ==
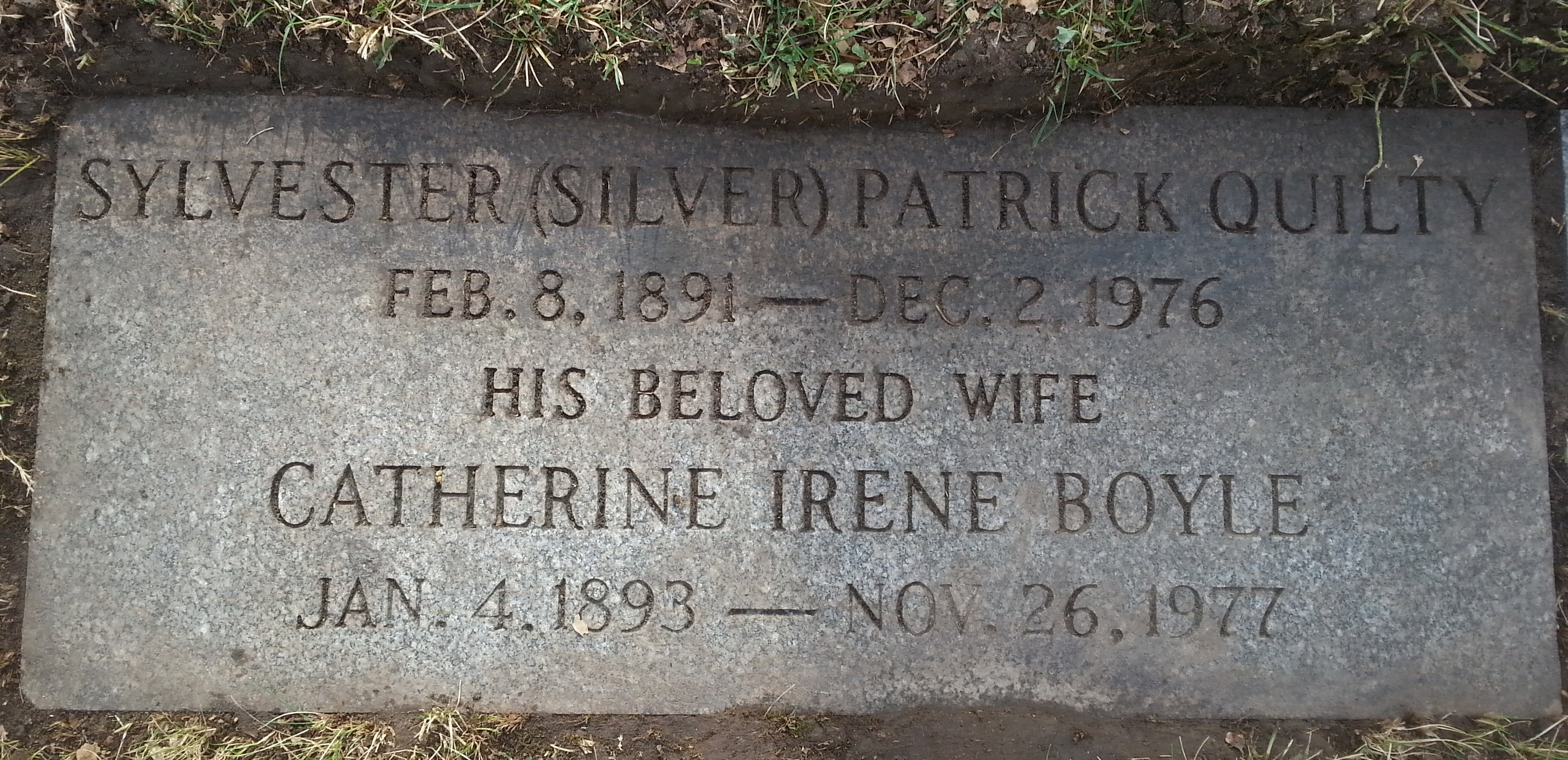
Quilty's grave marker at Notre-Dame Cemetery in Ottawa

In his professional career, Quilty was an insurance company executive and a civil servant in Ottawa. He married Catherine Boyle in Ottawa, circa World War I. The couple had five children together, including three boys and two girls.

Quilty's mother Mary died May 14, 1935, at age 92, in Mount St. Patrick, Ontario. His brother J.J. died in October 1944; he had been dean of the Catholic Diocese of Pembroke, Ontario, and for 39 years was the parish priest of St. Michael's in Douglas, Ontario.

Quilty's son Johnny played in the National Hockey League for the Montreal Canadiens, and the Boston Bruins. Johnny Quilty won the Calder Memorial Trophy as the league's rookie of the year in the 1940–41 NHL season. Johnny Quilty grew up watching the original Ottawa Senators play at home, was the light-heavyweight boxing champion of the Ottawa Valley in 1939, and served in the military during World War II. Johnny Quilty died on September 12, 1969, at age 48.

Quilty died on December 2, 1976, in Ottawa. He was interred at Notre-Dame Cemetery in Ottawa, with his wife's family in section 20, lot 5043.

== Honours ==
In 1966, Quilty was inducted into both the Ottawa Sport Hall of Fame, and the Canadian Football Hall of Fame. In 1973, he was inducted in the inaugural class of the Ottawa Gee-Gees Football Hall of Fame. Quilty attended the opening of the Canadian Football Hall of Fame building in Hamilton, Ontario, on September 14, 1973, at a mass induction ceremony for all of the previous 38 inductees. In 1975, he was inducted into Canada's Sports Hall of Fame, and attended a mass induction ceremony on August 23, 1975, for previous inductees of the Hockey Hall of Fame and the Canadian Football Hall of Fame.
