= Johnny Evans (Canadian football, born 1897) =

Canadian football player

Profile
- Position: Quarterback

Personal information
- Born: March 22, 1897; Kingston, Ontario, Canada
- Died: June 27, 1932 (aged 35); Sault Ste. Marie, Ontario, Canada

Career information
- College: Queen's University

Career history
- 1919–23: Queen's University
- 1924: Hamilton Tigers

Awards and highlights
- 2× Grey Cup champion (1922, 1923); 3× CFL Eastern All-Star (1921, 1922, 1923)

John Hamilton Evans (March 22, 1897 – June 27, 1932) was a university all-star and Grey Cup champion Canadian football quarterback.

While attending Queen's University, Evans had a spectacular football career. Quarterback for a Grey Cup championship dynasty, he led the Golden Gaels to two of their three victories (1922 & 1923), scoring two touchdowns in the 11th Grey Cup (the greatest victory in the history of the game; 54-0 over the Regina Roughriders). He was one of the top quarterbacks in the country, being selected as a Toronto Globe all-star three times.

He also played one season for the Hamilton Tigers in 1924.

Evans was one of the best players to ever wear the Tricolour, and one of Queen's best quarterbacks. He died on June 27, 1932 after accidentally driving his vehicle into a canal in Sault Ste. Marie, where he was working as a physician for the Algoma Steel Company. After his tragic accidental death, the University Football Team has presented an award, the Johnny Evans Memorial Award for Most Valuable Player, to honour his memory. He has been enshrined in the Queen's University Football Hall of Fame.
