= Ross Craig =

Canadian footballer (1884–1949)

Profile
- Position: Running back

Personal information
- Born: July 1, 1884; Peterborough, Ontario, Canada
- Died: June 27, 1949 (aged 64); Hamilton, Ontario, Canada

Career history
- 1911–1912: Hamilton Alerts
- 1913–1915, 1919–1920: Hamilton Tigers

Awards and highlights
- 2× Grey Cup champion (1912, 1913)
- Canadian Football Hall of Fame (Class of 1964)

Ross B. Craig (July 1, 1884 – June 27, 1949) was a Canadian star football player in the early 20th century. He played for several intermediate teams before playing for the Hamilton Alerts for two years where he won a Grey Cup championship in 1912. The following season, he joined the Interprovincial Rugby Football Union's Hamilton Tigers where he won another Grey Cup in 1913. He would finish his career with the Tigers in 1920, after playing five seasons with Hamilton.

Craig was born in Peterborough, Ontario, and died in Hamilton, Ontario. He was inducted into the Canadian Football Hall of Fame in 1964 and into the Canada's Sports Hall of Fame in 1975.
