= Leadlay =

Leadlay is a surname. Notable people with the surname include:

- Etelka A. Leadlay (born 1947), British botanist
- Pep Leadlay (1898–1984), Canadian football player
