= 1920 Ottawa Rough Riders season =

Canadian football team season

- Head coach: Silver Quilty
- Home stadium: Lansdowne Park

Results
- Record: 3–3
- League place: 3rd, IRFU
- Playoffs: Did not qualify

The 1920 Ottawa Rough Riders finished in third place in the Interprovincial Rugby Football Union with a 3–3 record, but failed to qualify for the playoffs.

== Regular season ==
=== Standings ===
Interprovincial Rugby Football Union
Team	GP	W	L	T	PF	PA	Pts
Toronto Argonauts	6	5	1	0	54	32	10
Hamilton Tigers	6	4	2	0	48	25	8
Ottawa Rough Riders	6	3	3	0	49	52	6
Montreal AAA	6	0	6	0	35	77	0

=== Schedule ===
Week	Date	Opponent	Results	
Week	Date	Opponent	Score	Record
1	Oct 2	vs. Hamilton Tigers	W 4–2	1–0
2	Oct 9	at Hamilton Tigers	L 6–19	2–0
3	Oct 16	at Montreal AAA	W 17–11	2–1
4	Oct 23	vs. Toronto Argonauts	L 3–9	3–1
5	Oct 30	vs. Montreal AAA	W 14–5	3–2
6	Nov 6	at Toronto Argonauts	L 5–6	3–3
