= 1923 Ottawa Rough Riders season =

Canadian football team season

- Head coach: Silver Quilty
- Home stadium: Lansdowne Park

Results
- Record: 1–5
- League place: 4th, IRFU
- Playoffs: Did not qualify

The 1923 Ottawa Rough Riders finished in fourth place in the Interprovincial Rugby Football Union with a 1–5 record and failed to qualify for the playoffs.

== Regular season ==
=== Standings ===
Interprovincial Rugby Football Union
Team	GP	W	L	T	PF	PA	Pts
Hamilton Tigers	6	4	1	1	58	54	9
Toronto Argonauts	6	3	1	2	71	41	8
Montreal AAA	6	2	3	1	45	73	5
Ottawa Rough Riders	6	1	5	0	54	60	2

=== Schedule ===
Week	Game	Date	Opponent	Results	
Week	Game	Date	Opponent	Score	Record
1	1	Sat, Sept 29	at Montreal AAA	L 15–20	0–1
2	2	Sat, Oct 6	vs. Toronto Argonauts	L 1–11	0–2
3	3	Sat, Oct 13	vs. Hamilton Tigers	W 29–11	1–2
4	4	Sat, Oct 20	at Hamilton Tigers	L 1–2	1–3
5	5	Sat, Oct 27	at Toronto Argonauts	L 2–7	1–4
6	6	Sat, Nov 3	vs. Montreal AAA	L 6–9	1–5
