= Harry Batstone =

Canadian football player

Profile
- Position: Running back

Personal information
- Born: May 9, 1899; Hamilton, Ontario, Canada
- Died: March 10, 1972 (aged 72); Kingston, Ontario, Canada

Career information
- College: Queen's University

Career history
- 1919–1921: Toronto Argonauts
- 1922–1927: Queen's University

Awards and highlights
- 3× Grey Cup champion (1922, 1923, 1924); 2× CFL Eastern All-Star (1921, 1923)
- Canadian Football Hall of Fame (Class of 1963)

Harry "Red" Batstone (September 5, 1899 – March 10, 1972) was a Canadian football player who played three seasons in the Interprovincial Rugby Football Union for the Toronto Argonauts and six seasons in the intercollegiate union for Queen's University. He was inducted into the Canadian Football Hall of Fame in the founding cohort in 1963, and into the Canada's Sports Hall of Fame in 1975.
