= Pep Leadlay =

Canadian football player (1898–1984)

Profile
- Position: Running back

Personal information
- Born: March 7, 1898; Hamilton, Ontario, Canada
- Died: September 8, 1984 (aged 86); Hamilton, Ontario, Canada

Career information
- College: Queen's University

Career history
- 1919–1920: Hamilton Tigers
- 1921–1925: Queen's University
- 1926–1930: Hamilton Tigers

Awards and highlights
- 5× Grey Cup champion (1922, 1923, 1924, 1928, 1929); 2× CFL Eastern All-Star (1922, 1923)
- Canadian Football Hall of Fame (Class of 1963)

Frank "Pep" Leadlay (March 7, 1898 – September 8, 1984) was a Canadian star football player for seven total seasons with the Hamilton Tigers. On October 15, 1927 he kicked a record of 5 field goals, all on drop kicks. He was inducted into the Canadian Football Hall of Fame in 1963 and into Canada's Sports Hall of Fame in 1975.
