= Sinc (disambiguation) =

Sinc is a mathematical function.

Sinc may also refer to:

- Sinc McEvenue, Canadian football coach
- Sisters in Crime, a writing organization
- Site of Importance for Nature Conservation
