= 1920 Toronto Argonauts season =

CFL team season

- Head coach: Mike Rodden
- Home stadium: Varsity Stadium

Results
- Record: 5–1
- Division place: 1st, IRFU
- Playoffs: Lost Grey Cup

The 1920 Toronto Argonauts season was the 34th season for the team since the franchise's inception in 1873. The team finished in first place in the Interprovincial Rugby Football Union with a 5–1 record and qualified for the playoffs. After defeating the Toronto Rowing and Athletic Association in the Eastern Final, the Argonauts lost the 8th Grey Cup to the Toronto Varsity Blues.

== Regular season ==
=== Standings ===
Interprovincial Rugby Football Union
Team	GP	W	L	T	PF	PA	Pts
Toronto Argonauts	6	5	1	0	54	32	10
Hamilton Tigers	6	4	2	0	48	25	8
Ottawa Senators	6	3	3	0	49	52	6
Montreal AAA Winged Wheelers	6	0	6	0	35	77	0

=== Schedule ===
Week	Game	Date	Opponent	Results	
Week	Game	Date	Opponent	Score	Record
1	1	Sat, Oct 2	vs. Montreal Winged Wheelers	W 19–8	1–0
2	2	Sat, Oct 9	at Montreal Winged Wheelers	W 10–6	2–0
3	3	Sat, Oct 16	vs. Hamilton Tigers	W 4–2	3–0
4	4	Sat, Oct 23	vs. Ottawa Senators	W 9–3	4–0
5	5	Sat, Oct 30	at Hamilton Tigers	L 6–8	4–1
6	6	Sat, Nov 6	vs. Ottawa Senators	W 6–5	5–1

== Postseason ==
The Argonauts' 7–6 victory over Toronto in the Eastern Final on November 20 was voided by the Canadian Rugby Union on November 23, in response to a formal protest filed by the losing team concerning a scoring decision by the game officials. As a result of the decision to uphold this appeal, the two teams were directed to replay the second half of the game, on November 27, with the score standing at 2–0 in favour of the Argonauts, as it had stood at halftime in the first game.

Round	Date	Opponent	Results		Venue
Round	Date	Opponent	Score	Record	Venue
Eastern Final (voided)	Sat, Nov 20	vs. Toronto Rowing and Athletic Association	W 7–6	0–0	Varsity Stadium
Eastern Final (replay)	Sat, Nov 27	vs. Toronto Rowing and Athletic Association	W 5–2	1–0	Rosedale Field
Grey Cup	Sat, Dec 4	vs. Toronto Varsity Blues	L 3–16	1–1	Varsity Stadium

=== Grey Cup ===
December 4 @ Varsity Stadium (Attendance: 10,088)

Team	Q1	Q2	Q3	Q4	Total
Toronto Argonauts	1	0	1	1	3
Toronto Varsity Blues	0	6	5	5	16
