= Frank Knight (Canadian football) =

Profile
- Position: Outside wing

Career history

Playing
- 1909: Toronto Argonauts
- 1911–13: Varsity Blues
- 1914–15, 1919–20: Toronto Argonauts

Coaching
- 1927–1928: Toronto Argonauts

Awards and highlights
- 2x Grey Cup Champion (3rd and 6th)

Frank Knight was a Canadian professional football player and coach who was the head coach of Toronto Argonauts from 1927-1928.
