= 1922 in Canadian football =

== Canadian Football News in 1922 ==
The Edmonton Eskimos were renamed the Edmonton Elks.

== Regular season ==
=== Final regular season standings ===
Note: GP = Games Played, W = Wins, L = Losses, T = Ties, PF = Points For, PA = Points Against, Pts = Points

**Interprovincial Rugby Football Union**
Team	GP	W	L	T	PF	PA	Pts
**Toronto Argonauts**	6	5	0	1	110	24	11
Hamilton Tigers	6	3	1	2	50	43	8
Montreal AAA	6	2	4	0	43	56	4
Ottawa Rough Riders	6	0	5	1	23	103	1

Ontario Rugby Football Union
Team	GP	W	L	T	PF	PA	Pts
**Parkdale Rowing Club**	6	6	0	0	83	28	12
Toronto Varsity Orfuns	6	2	4	0	58	58	4
Hamilton Rowing Club	4	1	3	0	30	58	2
St. Brigids	4	1	3	0	23	49	2

**Intercollegiate Rugby Football Union**
Team	GP	W	L	T	PF	PA	Pts
**Queen's University**	4	3	1	0	48	48	6
Varsity Blues	4	3	1	0	108	24	6
McGill Redmen	4	0	4	0	18	103	2

*Bold text means that they have clinched the playoffs

Manitoba Rugby Football Union
Team	GP	W	L	T	PF	PA	Pts
**Winnipeg Victorias**	4	4	0	0	59	24	8
University of Manitoba Varsity	4	1	3	0	41	50	2
Winnipeg Tammany Tigers	4	1	3	0	29	55	2

Saskatchewan Rugby Football Union
Team	GP	W	L	T	PF	PA	Pts
Regina City League
**Regina Rugby Club**	4	4	0	0	104	2	8
Regina Boat Club	4	0	4	0	2	104	0
Saskatoon City Championship
**Saskatoon Quakers**	1	1	0	0	9	0	2
University of Saskatchewan Varsity	1	0	1	0	0	9	0

Alberta Rugby Football Union
Team	GP	W	L	T	PF	PA	Pts
**Edmonton Elks**	2	2	0	0	56	1	4
Edmonton Harlequins	2	0	2	0	1	56	0

== League Champions ==
Football Union	League Champion
IRFU	Toronto Argonauts
WCRFU	Edmonton Elks
CIRFU	Queen's University
ORFU	Toronto Parkdale
MRFU	Winnipeg Victorias
SRFU	Regina Rugby Club
ARFU	Edmonton Elks

== Grey Cup playoffs ==
Note: All dates in 1922

=== SRFU Playoff ===
Date	Away	Home
October 28	Saskatoon Quakers 5	Regina Rugby Club 7

- Regina wins the SRFU championship.

=== I.C.R.F.L final ===
November 18 Molson Stadium – Montreal, Quebec
Queen's University 12	Toronto Varsity Blues 6

- Queen's advances to the East Final.

=== Western semifinal ===
Date	Away	Home
November 6	Regina Rugby Club 8	Edmonton Elks 13

- Edmonton advances to the West Final.

=== Western final ===
Date	Away	Home
November 11	Winnipeg Victorias 6	Edmonton Elks 19

- Edmonton advances to the Grey Cup.

=== East semifinal ===
Date	Away	Home
November 18	Toronto Parkdale Rowing Club 1	Toronto Argonauts 20

- Toronto Argonauts advance to the East Final.

=== East final ===
Date	Away	Home
November 25	Queen's University 12	Toronto Argonauts 11

- Queen's advances to the Grey Cup.

== Playoff bracket ==
Quarterfinals
CIRFU	Queen's University	12
CIRFU	University of Toronto	6
EAST
IRFU	Toronto Argonauts	20
ORFU	Toronto Parkdale	1
MRFU	Winnipeg Victorias
BYE
WEST
SRFU	Regina Rugby Club	8
ARFU	Edmonton Elks	13

Semifinals
CIRFU	Queen's University	12
IRFU	Toronto Argonauts	11
MRFU	Winnipeg Victorias	1
ARFU	Edmonton Elks	19

Grey Cup final
CIRFU	Queen's University	13
ARFU	Edmonton Elks	1

== Grey Cup Championship ==
December 2 10th Annual Grey Cup Game: Richardson Memorial Stadium - Kingston, Ontario
Edmonton Elks 1	Queen's University 13
Queen's University are the 1922 Grey Cup Champions

== 1922 Toronto Globe Eastern All-Stars ==
NOTE: During this time most players played both ways, so the All-Star selections do not distinguish between some offensive and defensive positions.

- FW - Gordon Duncan, University of Toronto
- HB - Pep Leadley, Queen's University
- HB - Warren Snyder, University of Toronto
- HB - Lionel Conacher, Toronto Argonauts
- QB - Johnny Evans, Queen's University
- C - Lionel Shoebottom, Toronto Parkdale
- G - ???, University of Toronto
- G - Harold Pugh, Toronto Argonauts
- T - Doug Ambridge, McGill University
- T - ???, Montreal AAA
- E - Cap Fear, Toronto Argonauts
- E - Bud Thomas, Ottawa Rough Riders
