= Cap Fear =

Canadian football player

Profile
- Position: Outside wing

Personal information
- Born: June 11, 1901; Old Sailbury, England
- Died: February 12, 1978 (aged 76); St. Catharines, Ontario, Canada

Career history
- 1919–1926: Toronto Argonauts
- 1927: Montreal AAA Winged Wheelers
- 1928–1932: Hamilton Tigers

Awards and highlights
- 3× Grey Cup champion (1921, 1928, 1929); 2× CFL Eastern All-Star (1922, 1923)
- Canadian Football Hall of Fame (Class of 1967)

Alfred Henry "Cap" Fear (June 11, 1901 – February 12, 1978) was a star football player in the Canadian Football League (CFL) for seven seasons for the Toronto Argonauts. He was inducted into the Canadian Football Hall of Fame in 1967 and into the Canada's Sports Hall of Fame in 1975.
