= 1926 Toronto Argonauts season =

CFL team season

- Head coach: Mike Rodden
- Home stadium: Maple Leaf Stadium

Results
- Record: 3–3
- Division place: 3rd, IRFU
- Playoffs: Did not qualify

The 1926 Toronto Argonauts season was the 40th season for the team since the franchise's inception in 1873. The team finished in third place in the Interprovincial Rugby Football Union with a 3–3 record and failed to qualify for the playoffs.

== Regular season ==
=== Standings ===
Interprovincial Rugby Football Union
| Team | GP | W | L | T | PF | PA | Pts |
|---|---|---|---|---|---|---|---|
| Ottawa Senators | 6 | 5 | 1 | 0 | 72 | 57 | 10 |
| Hamilton Tigers | 6 | 3 | 3 | 0 | 67 | 45 | 6 |
| Toronto Argonauts | 6 | 3 | 3 | 0 | 53 | 55 | 6 |
| Montreal AAA Winged Wheelers | 6 | 1 | 5 | 0 | 48 | 83 | 2 |

=== Schedule ===
| Week | Game | Date | Opponent | Results | |
| Week | Game | Date | Opponent | Score | Record |
|---|---|---|---|---|---|
| 1 | 1 | Sat, Oct 9 | vs. Montreal Winged Wheelers | L 8–13 | 0–1 |
| 2 | 2 | Sat, Oct 16 | at Ottawa Senators | L 2–16 | 0–2 |
| 3 | 3 | Sat, Oct 23 | vs. Hamilton Tigers | W 7–3 | 1–2 |
| 4 | 4 | Sat, Oct 30 | at Montreal Winged Wheelers | W 7–2 | 2–2 |
| 5 | 5 | Sat, Nov 6 | at Hamilton Tigers | L 5–21 | 2–3 |
| 6 | 6 | Sat, Nov 13 | vs. Ottawa Senators | W 24–0 | 3–3 |
