= 1923 in Canadian football =

== Canadian Football News in 1923 ==
Calgary Tigers were renamed the 50th Battalion.

Queen's defeats Regina 54–0 as Queen's scored a record nine touchdowns on December 1.

== Regular season ==
=== Final regular season standings ===
Note: GP = Games Played, W = Wins, L = Losses, T = Ties, PF = Points For, PA = Points Against, Pts = Points

Interprovincial Rugby Football Union
Team	GP	W	L	T	PF	PA	Pts
Hamilton Tigers	6	4	1	1	58	54	9
Toronto Argonauts	6	3	1	2	71	41	8
Montreal AAA	6	2	3	1	45	73	5
Ottawa Rough Riders	6	1	5	0	54	60	2

Ontario Rugby Football Union
Team	GP	W	L	T	PF	PA	Pts
Hamilton Rowing Club	4	4*	0	0	20	9	8
Parkdale Rowing Club	4	2	2*	0	26	4	4
Toronto Varsity Orfuns	4	0	4	0	10	43	0

* Parkdale forfeited last game to Hamilton, 0-0

Intercollegiate Rugby Football Union
Team	GP	W	L	T	PF	PA	Pts
Queen's University	4	4	0	0	70	14	8
Varsity Blues	4	1	3	0	38	52	2
McGill Redmen	4	1	3	0	31	73	2

Manitoba Rugby Football Union
Team	GP	W	L	T	PF	PA	Pts
Winnipeg Victorias	4	4	0	0	176	20	8
University of Manitoba Varsity	4	2	2	0	73	108	4
Winnipeg Tammany Tigers	4	0	4	0	42	163	0

Saskatchewan Rugby Football Union
Team	GP	W	L	T	PF	PA	Pts
Regina Rugby Club	4	3	1	0	38	8	6
Saskatoon Quakers	4	1	3	0	8	38	2

Alberta Rugby Football Union
Team	GP	W	L	T	PF	PA	Pts
Edmonton Eskimos	2	2	0	0	30	9	4
University of Alberta Varsity	2	0	2	0	9	30	0

These two games were actually a playoff to see who would play Calgary 50th Battalion in the finals. The results from the full season are unknown.

== League Champions ==
Football Union	League Champion
IRFU	Hamilton Tigers
WCRFU	Regina Roughriders
CIRFU	Queen's University
ORFU	Hamilton Rowing Club
MRFU	Winnipeg Victorias
SRFU	Regina Roughriders
ARFU	Edmonton Eskimos

== Grey Cup playoffs ==
Note: All dates in 1923

=== ARFU Finals ===
ARFU Finals Games 1 & 2
Date	Away	Home
October 27	Edmonton Eskimos 13	Calgary 50th Battalion 7
October 31	Calgary 50th Battalion	Edmonton Eskimos

- The second game was cancelled and the Edmonton Eskimos win the ARFU championship. Game was originally scheduled for November 3 but it had to be moved up to accommodate the western playoff versus Regina. Calgary was unable to organize its players on short notice for a mid-week game in Edmonton.

=== West semifinal ===
Date	Away	Home
November 3	Edmonton Eskimos 6	Regina Rugby Club 9

=== West final ===
Date	Away	Home
November 10	Regina Rugby Club 11	Winnipeg Victorias 1

- Regina advances to the Grey Cup.

=== East semifinal ===
Date	Away	Home
November 17	Hamilton Rowing Club 1	Hamilton Tigers 24

- Hamilton Tigers advances to the East Final.

=== East final ===
Date	Away	Home
November 24	Queen's University 13	Hamilton Tigers 5

- Queen's advances to the Grey Cup.

== Playoff bracket ==
Quarterfinals
CIRFU	Queen's University
BYE
EAST
IRFU	Hamilton Tigers	24
ORFU	Hamilton Rowing Club	1
MRFU	Winnipeg Victorias
BYE
WEST
SRFU	Regina Rugby Club	9
ARFU	Edmonton Eskimos	6

Semifinals
CIRFU	Queen's University	13
IRFU	Hamilton Tigers	5
MRFU	Winnipeg Victorias	1
SRFU	Regina Rugby Club	11

Grey Cup final
CIRFU	Queen's University	54
SRFU	Regina Rugby Club	0

== Grey Cup Championship ==
December 1 11th Annual Grey Cup Game: Varsity Stadium – Toronto, Ontario
Regina Rugby Club 0	Queen's University 54
Queen's University are the 1923 Grey Cup Champions

== 1923 Toronto Globe Eastern All-Stars ==
NOTE: During this time most players played both ways, so the All-Star selections do not distinguish between some offensive and defensive positions.

- FW - ??? Douglas, Parkdale Rowing Club
- HB - Pep Leadley, Queen's University
- HB - Warren Snyder, University of Toronto
- HB - Harry Batstone, Queen's University
- QB - Johnny Evans, Queen's University
- C - Ernie Cox, Hamilton Tigers
- G - ??? Tuck, Hamilton Tigers
- G - Brian Timmins, Ottawa Rough Riders
- T - John McKelvey, Queen's University
- T - Gear Elford, Hamilton Rowing Club
- E - Cap Fear, Toronto Argonauts
- E - Bud Thomas, Queen's University
