= Billy Hughes (Canadian football) =

Canadian football and ice hockey coach and player

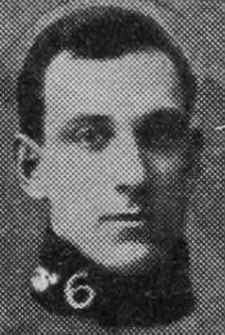
- Hughes with the Montreal Stars ice hockey club.
- Born: Wilfred Perry Hughes; 1888; Renfrew, Ontario, Canada
- Died: August 28, 1955 (aged 66–67); Montreal, Quebec, Canada
- Occupations: Football & ice hockey coach

Wilfred Perry "Billy" Hughes (1888 – August 28, 1955) was a Canadian football and ice hockey player and coach.

== Biography ==
Hughes was born in Renfrew, Ontario in 1888 and played both football and ice hockey while a student at McGill University in Montreal. He also played ice hockey with the Montreal Stars, champions of the 1914–15 Montreal Hockey League and holders of the 1915 Art Ross Trophy.

He was a football coach for several teams: Montreal AAA Winged Wheelers (1919-1921 and 1928–1930), Hamilton Tigers (1932), Queen's University (1922–1926), Ottawa Rough Riders (1935–1936), Montreal Bulldogs (1940–1941), Lachine RCAF Station Flyers (1942–1943) and Montreal Hornets (1945). As a coach Hughes won the Grey Cup with Queen's University three straight years in 1922, 1923 and 1924. At Queen's University he also coached the Queen's University Golden Gaels ice hockey team in the CIAU. Hughes also won a Grey Cup as a coach of the Hamilton Tigers in 1932.

Hughes died at Montreal General Hospital on August 28, 1955. He was admitted posthumously to the Canadian Football Hall of Fame in 1974.
