= Al Ritchie =

Canadian football player and sports coach (1890–1966)

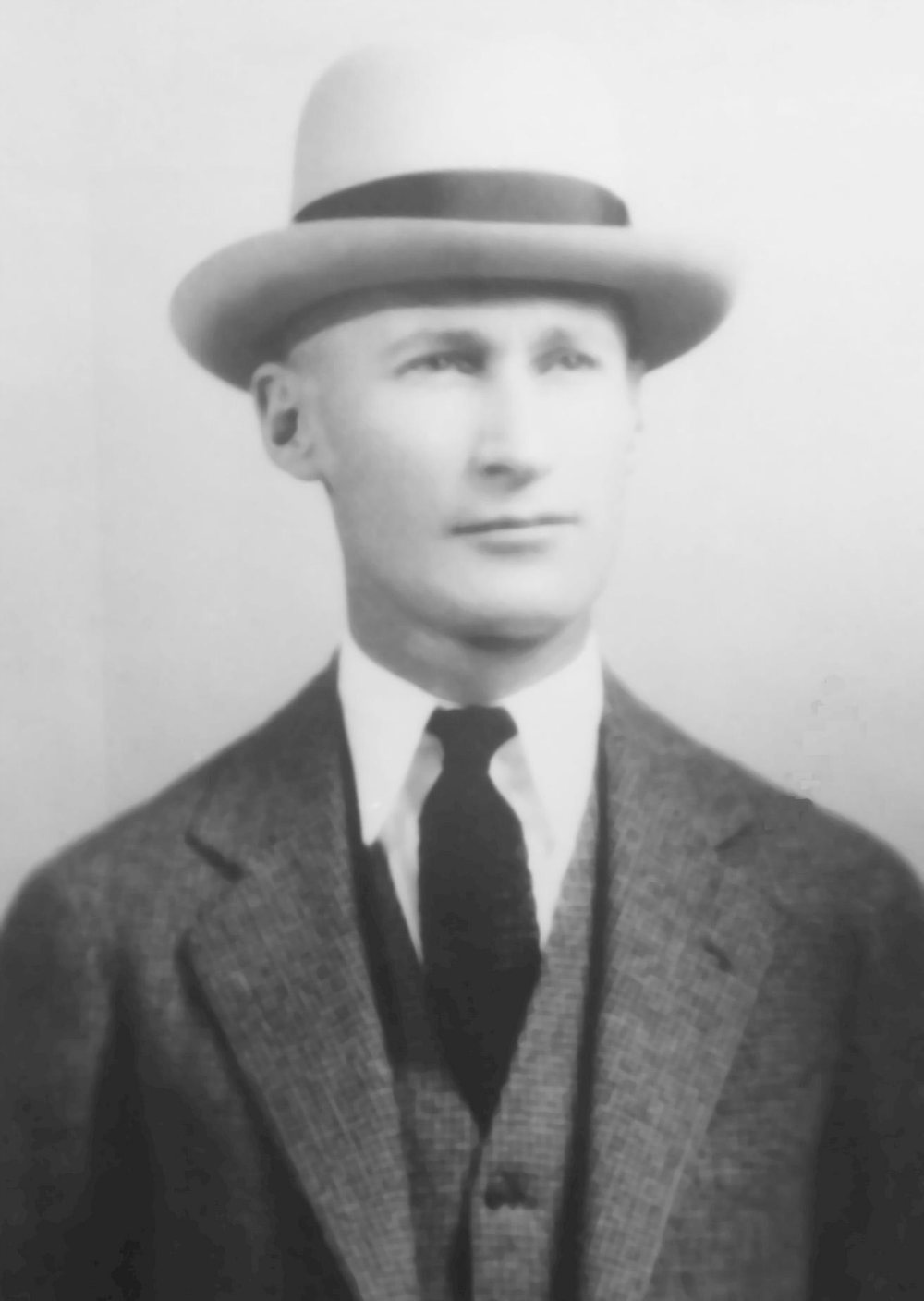
- Ritchie as coach of the Roughriders, c. 1920s

Personal information
- Born: December 12, 1890; Cobden, Ontario, Canada
- Died: February 21, 1966 (aged 75); Regina, Saskatchewan, Canada

Career history

Playing
- c.1910–c.1915: Saskatchewan Rugby Team

Coaching
- 1923–c.1930 (Hockey), 1925–? (Football): Regina Pats
- 1928–1932, 1935, 1942: Regina Roughriders

Operations
- c.1918–c.1922: Victoria Senior Hockey Team
- 1921–1928: Regina Rugby Club/Regina Roughriders
- 1923–c.1930: Regina Pats

scout
- 1933–1966: New York Rangers: 2× Western Canada Hockey champion (1921, 1922); 8× Western Canada Football champion (1923, 1926–1932); Canada's Sports Hall of Fame (1964); Saskatchewan Sports Hall of Fame (1966); Saskatchewan Roughriders Plaza of Honor
- Canadian Football Hall of Fame (Class of 1963)

Alvin Horace "Al" Ritchie (December 12, 1890 – February 21, 1966), also known by his nickname "the Silver Fox", was a Canadian football player, coach, and administrator who was the head coach of the Regina Roughriders from 1928 to 1932, in 1935, and in 1942. He had many accomplishments and honors, including being named to the Canadian Football Hall of Fame (as a charter member), Canada's Sports Hall of Fame and the Saskatchewan Sports Hall of Fame. The Al Ritchie Memorial Stadium, Al Ritchie Arena, and Al Ritchie Neighborhood are named in his honor.

In the 1910s, prior to serving in World War I, Ritchie played for a Saskatchewan rugby team and was a player-coach in baseball, hockey and lacrosse. From about 1918 to about 1922, he was the coach of the Victoria Senior Hockey team, leading them to the championship in 1921 and in 1922. In addition to coaching the Roughriders, he was their manager through most of the 1920s, while also coaching the Regina Pats football and ice hockey teams (being the only person to win the championship in both sports). While coaching and managing the Roughriders from 1928 to 1932, they made the Grey Cup each season, but lost in all five matches. Ritchie also worked as a scout for the New York Rangers from 1933 until his death in 1966.

== Early life and playing career ==
Al Ritchie was born on December 12, 1890, in Cobden, Ontario. He played football for a Saskatchewan football team in the 1910s while serving as a player coach in baseball, hockey, and lacrosse. He then went into World War I and served as an artilleryman.

== Coaching career ==
=== Victoria Senior Hockey Team ===
After returning from World War I, Ritchie continued to coach hockey and football. His first position after the War was as a coach for the Victoria Senior Hockey team in the Manitoba Hockey League. He led them to championships in 1921 and 22.

=== Regina Pats ===
From 1923 to about 1930, he was the coach for the Regina Pats hockey team. He helped create the Regina Pats football team and led them to the championship in 1928. He led their hockey team to Memorial Cup championships in 1925 and 1930. He is the only person to ever win the championship in both hockey and football. He also was their team manager.

=== Regina Rugby Club/Roughriders ===
While he was the coach of the Victoria Hockey team, he became the general manager of the Saskatchewan Roughriders (then known as the Regina Rugby Club). He led the Roughriders to Western Championships in 1923, 1926, 1927, 1928, 1929, 1930, 1931, and 1932. They made the Grey Cup five consecutive years from 1928 to 1932, the years Ritchie was head coach, and lost all five games. Ritchie retired in 1932, but then unretired and continued coaching. He then retired again in 1933, but returned in 1935. He retired a third time in 1936, but made one final return in 1942. At one point the Roughriders had 56 consecutive wins while Ritchie was coach. He was later inducted into the Roughriders' plaza of honor.

== Later life and death ==
At the end of his coaching career, he became a scout for the New York Rangers, and was a scout from 1933 until his death in 1966. From the 1920s until 1956, he worked for the Federal Department of Customs. In 1956, he was honored by the council of the Winnipeg Football Club. They said "While many Canadian football operators, whether it is a team, a club or a league, require a considerable number of men, there at times emerges a single man in such operators who seems to symbolize the spirit of football across Canada. Such a man is Alvin Horace Ritchie." In 1963, he was a charter member for the Canadian Football Hall of Fame. In 1964, he was inducted into Canada's Sports Hall of Fame. He died on February 21, 1966, in Regina, Saskatchewan, after a battle with cancer. He was posthumously inducted into the Saskatchewan Sports Hall of Fame.

=== Legacy ===
Many tributes were made to Ritchie after his death, including by: Vern DeGreer, Jack Wells, Bill Good, Hal Pawson, Jack Matheson, Hal Walker, and Jim Coleman. Athol Murray, one of Ritchie's friends, said that he was "The Knute Rockne of Canada". In March of 1966, there was a unanimous vote to name a building in Saskatchewan the "Al Ritchie Memorial Centre". There later was a neighborhood in Regina named after him. It had a population of about 8,000 in 2016. Multiple buildings in the neighborhood were also named after him, they included the: Core Ritchie Neighbourhood Centre, Al Ritchie Wellness Centre, Al Ritchie Community Association, and Al Ritchie Arena.
