= 1911 in Canadian football =

The University of Toronto's Grey Cup dynasty continued in 1911, when they defeated their cross-town rival Toronto Argonauts at the new Varsity Stadium.

== Canadian football news in 1911 ==
Manitoba, Saskatchewan and Alberta Unions formed the Western Canada Rugby Football Union on October 21. The Regina Rugby Club changed its colours to blue and white. Winnipeg realtor Hugo Ross donated the championship trophy bearing his name; he subsequently drowned in the sinking of the S.S. Titanic in April 1912.

The WCRFU, with the support of the Albertan and Manitoban unions, adopted a playoff format in which the MRFU champion would host the SRFU champion, with ARFU hosting the winner of that game in the Western final. Although this was done ostensibly to minimize travel the SRFU champion Regina Rugby Club balked at the prospect of traveling for two playoff games and boycotted the Western playoffs altogether. This conflict was resolved the following year by changing the format so that it was the union without a home game in the Western playoffs that would receive the bye to the Western final.

The Calgary Tigers of the ARFU won the Western Championship, and challenged for the Grey Cup, but the CRU would not accept the challenge because the WCRFU was not a full member of the CRU.

== Regular season ==
=== Final regular season standings ===
Note: GP = Games Played, W = Wins, L = Losses, T = Ties, PF = Points For, PA = Points Against, Pts = Points

**Interprovincial Rugby Football Union**
| Team | GP | W | L | T | PF | PA | Pts |
|---|---|---|---|---|---|---|---|
| **Toronto Argonauts** | 6 | 5 | 1 | 0 | 56 | 31 | 10 |
| Hamilton Tigers | 6 | 3 | 3 | 0 | 83 | 57 | 6 |
| Ottawa Rough Riders | 6 | 3 | 3 | 0 | 61 | 83 | 6 |
| Montreal Football Club | 6 | 1 | 5 | 0 | 49 | 78 | 2 |

Ontario Rugby Football Union
| Team | GP | W | L | T | PF | PA | Pts |
|---|---|---|---|---|---|---|---|
| **Hamilton Alerts** | 5 | 5 | 0 | 0 | 151 | 25 | 10 |
| **Toronto Amateur Athletic Club** | 5 | 3 | 2 | 0 | 102 | 40 | 6 |
| St. Michael's College | 5 | 2 | 3 | 0 | 42 | 112 | 4 |
| Dundas Rugby Club | 5 | 0 | 5 | 0 | 19 | 96 | 0 |

**Intercollegiate Rugby Football Union**
| Team | GP | W | L | T | PF | PA | Pts |
|---|---|---|---|---|---|---|---|
| **Varsity Blues** | 6 | 5 | 1 | 0 | 112 | 67 | 10 |
| University of Ottawa | 6 | 4 | 2 | 0 | 85 | 93 | 8 |
| McGill Redmen | 6 | 3 | 3 | 0 | 121 | 93 | 6 |
| Queen's University | 6 | 0 | 6 | 0 | 59 | 124 | 0 |

*Bold text means that they have clinched the playoffs

Manitoba Rugby Football Union
| Team | GP | W | L | T | PF | PA | Pts |
|---|---|---|---|---|---|---|---|
| Winnipeg Rowing Club | 4 | 3 | 1 | 0 | 61 | 24 | 6 |
| St.John's Rugby Football Club | 4 | 1 | 3 | 0 | 24 | 61 | 2 |

Saskatchewan Rugby Football Union
| Team | GP | W | L | T | PF | PA | Pts |
|---|---|---|---|---|---|---|---|
| Regina Rugby Club | 4 | 3 | 1 | 0 | 51 | 27 | 6 |
| Moose Jaw Tigers | 4 | 3 | 1 | 0 | 60 | 39 | 6 |
| Saskatoon Rugby Club | 4 | 0 | 4 | 0 | 15 | 60 | 0 |

Alberta Rugby Football Union
| Team | GP | W | L | T | PF | PA | Pts |
|---|---|---|---|---|---|---|---|
| Calgary Tigers | 6 | 5 | 0 | 1 | 109 | 13 | 11 |
| Edmonton Eskimos | 6 | 4 | 1 | 1 | 73 | 41 | 9 |
| Edmonton YMCA | 6 | 2 | 4 | 0 | 24 | 85 | 4 |
| Calgary Rough Riders | 6 | 0 | 6 | 0 | 18 | 85 | 0 |

== League Champions ==
| Football Union | League Champion |
|---|---|
| IRFU | Toronto Argonauts |
| WCRFU | Calgary Tigers |
| CIRFU | University of Toronto |
| ORFU | Hamilton Alerts |
| MRFU | Winnipeg Rowing Club |
| SRFU | Regina Rugby Club |
| ARFU | Calgary Tigers |

== Playoffs ==
Note: All dates in 1911

=== SRFU tie-breaker final ===
| Date | Away | Home |
|---|---|---|
| November 4 | Moose Jaw Tigers 11 | Regina Rugby Club 21 |

- Regina is SRFU champions

=== Alberta Rugby Football Union final ===
| Date | Away | Home |
|---|---|---|
| November 4 | Edmonton Eskimos 0 | Calgary Tigers 14 |

=== Western final ===
| Date | Away | Home |
|---|---|---|
| November 18 | Winnipeg Rowing Club 6 | Calgary Tigers 13 |

- CRU would not accept Calgary's Grey Cup challenge because the WCRFU was not a full member of the CRU

=== East semifinal ===
| Date | Away | Home |
|---|---|---|
| November 18 | Toronto Argonauts 9 | Hamilton Alerts 2 |

- Toronto Argonauts advance to the Grey Cup.

== Playoff bracket ==
Semifinals
CIRFU | University of Toronto
BYE
IRFU | Toronto Argonauts | 9
ORFU | Hamilton Alerts | 2

Grey Cup final
CIRFU | University of Toronto | 14
IRFU | Toronto Argonauts | 7

== Grey Cup Championship ==
November 25 3rd Annual Grey Cup Game: Varsity Stadium – Toronto, Ontario
| Toronto Argonauts 4 | Toronto Varsity Blues 11 |
Toronto Varsity Blues are the 1911 Grey Cup Champions
