= Joanna Batstone =

British physics researcher and data scientist

Joanna L. Batstone
- Employer: Monash University
- Known for: AI technology and Data Science

Joanna L. Batstone is a British Physics and AI researcher and data scientist. She was the Director of the Monash Data Futures Institute from 2020-2025, and was awarded as a Fellow of the Australian Academy of Technological Sciences and Engineering in 2023.

== Education ==
Batstone was awarded a Bachelor of Science (Hons) degree in Chemical Physics and a Doctor of Philosophy degree in physics from the University of Bristol, United Kingdom. Subsequently, Batstone conducted postdoctoral research at AT&T Bell Laboratories in New Jersey and held a Lectureship position in the Department of Materials Science and Engineering at the University of Liverpool, UK.

== Career ==
Batstone worked as a Postdoctoral Member of Technical Staff at the AT&T Bell labs, in Murray Hill, New Jersey, from 1985 to 1987. She then worked at the University of Liverpool, Great Britain, from 1987-1989 as a Lecturer in the Department of Materials Science and Metallurgy, before joining the IBM Thomas J Watson Research Centre, in New York. Batstone held a range of technical and business leadership roles in IBM’s Research and development laboratories including work with IBM Watson Data & AI. Batstone completed IBM international assignments in Dublin, Ireland from 2011-2014 with IBM Global Technology Services and in Melbourne, Australia, from 2014-2017 as the Vice President and Chief Technology Officer for IBM Australia and New Zealand and the Director of IBM Research Australia. Batstone returned to New York in 2018 with IBM Watson and was Vice President Innovation IBM Corporate strategy.

Batstone joined Monash University, from 2020 onwards as the inaugural Director of the Monash Data Futures Institute.

She has been a keynote speaker at Science Technology Australia events, including discussions on corporate investment in R&D, as well as on using AI for social good, at the University of New South Wales.

Batstone has been involved in researching AI and machine learning address a variety of issues, including helping people living with diabetes as well as to identify malignant melanomas and the use of data to help stop human trafficking. Batstone is noted for being "a pioneer on using data science for social good."

Batstone has worked with AI, with the potential to do societal good, with AI becoming a prevalent topic of conversation in Australia. She has worked with AI research for detection of Melanomas, saving lives, and increasing the ability to provide diagnoses faster, and assisting dermatologists. When describing a report on AI and public perceptions, she commented:

"This Monash Data Futures Institute report presents one of the first comprehensive pictures of Australian public understandings, attitudes and opinions relating to AI and society and reveals high levels of support for the use of AI to address social, humanitarian and environmental challenges."

== Publications ==
Batstone had over 80 peer-reviewed publications, as at October 2023.

Select examples of these include:

- C. Hayzelden, J. L. Batstone; Silicide formation and silicide‐mediated crystallization of nickel‐implanted amorphous silicon thin films. J. Appl. Phys. 15 June 1993; 73 (12): 8279–8289.
- Hayzelden, C., Batstone, J.L. High Resolution In Situ TEM Studies of Silicide-Mediated Crystallization of Amorphous Silicon. MRS Online Proceedings Library 321, 579–584 (1993).
- J. L. Batstone, M. A. Tischler, R. T. Collins; Stability of visible luminescence from porous silicon. Appl. Phys. Lett. 24 May 1993; 62 (21): 2667–2669.

== Awards ==
- 2022 - Honorary Doctorate of Engineering - Bristol University
- 1995 - Burton Medal from the Microscopy Society of America
- 1991 - Robert Lansing Hardy Gold Medal from The Minerals, Metals and Materials Society
- 1989 - Cosslett Award from the Microbeam Analysis Society
