= 3rd Grey Cup =

1911 Canadian Football championship game

| Toronto Argonauts | Toronto Varsity Blues |
|---|---|
| (5–1) | (5–1) |
| 7 | 14 |
| Head coach: Billy Foulds | Head coach: Dr. A.B. Wright |
| | 1 | 2 | 3 | 4 | Total |
|---|---|---|---|---|---|
| Toronto Argonauts | 1 | 0 | 2 | 4 | 7 |
| Toronto Varsity Blues | 0 | 6 | 7 | 1 | 14 |
- Date: November 25, 1911
- Stadium: Varsity Stadium
- Location: Toronto
- Attendance: 13,687

The 3rd Grey Cup (the championship of the Canadian Football League) was played on November 25, 1911, before 13,687 fans at Varsity Stadium at Toronto.

The University of Toronto Varsity Blues defeated the Toronto Argonauts 14–7.

== Game summary ==
U. of Toronto Varsity Blues (14) – TDs, Allan Ramsey, Frank Knight; cons., Jack Maynard (2); singles, Maynard (2).

Toronto Argonauts (7) – FG, Ross Binkley; singles, Binkley (3), Bill Mallet.

== Toronto Varsity Blues roster ==
- Manager F.J. Mulqueen * Head Coach Dr. A.B. Wright

Players * T. Dales * H. Taylor * G. Peter Campbell * Elliot Green * Al Ramsey * Geoffery Taylor * Lloyd Sifton * Frank Hassard * N. Lorimer * B. Frith * Bobby Singclair * Stan Clark * Pete German * J.M. "Duff" Wood * Edward "Ted" Knox * C.E. MacDonald * Frank Knight * Bill Curtis * Bob Thompson * Ralph Bell * Rod Grass * Lew Cory * Bill Cruickshank
