= Jack Eadie =

Personal information
- Born: 1888 or 1889
- Died: after 1955

Career information
- College: Springfield College

Career history

Playing
- c.1920–1923: Regina Rugby Club

Coaching
- 1922–1923: Regina Rugby Club
- 1924–1954: Berkeley High School

Jack Eadie (born 1888 or 1889) was a Canadian football player and coach who was the head coach of the Regina Ruby Club from 1922 to 1923. After his time with Regina he was a multi-sport coach at Berkeley High School from 1924 to 1954, retiring at the age of 65.

== Sports career ==
Eadie played college football at Springfield College in Massachusetts. Eadie's first professional team was the Regina Rugby Club. He played his first season in c.1920. In 1922, he was named head coach of Regina. In his first season, Regina went undefeated with a 4–0 record, but lost in the playoffs to the Edmonton Eskimos. He was described in a 1923 article by The Leader-Post as, "undoubtedly one of Canada's best." In his second season, they went 3–1, making the Grey Cup for the first time in team history. However, Regina lost 54–0. Eadie left the Rugby Club in 1924 and became a coach at Berkeley High School in California. He originally was given the tasks of basketball, baseball, and swimming coach but was assigned football in 1931. He retired from coaching in 1954, after 30 seasons. As coach of the baseball team, they won 9 Alameda championships.
