= 8th Grey Cup =

1920 Canadian Football championship game

Toronto Argonauts	Toronto Varsity Blues
(5–1)	(3–1)
3	16
Head coach: Mike Rodden	Head coach: Laddie Cassels
	1	2	3	4	Total
Toronto Argonauts	1	0	1	1	3
Toronto Varsity Blues	0	6	5	5	16
- Date: December 4, 1920
- Stadium: Varsity Stadium
- Location: Toronto
- Attendance: 10,088

The 8th Grey Cup was played on December 4, 1920, before 10,088 fans at Varsity Stadium at Toronto. It was the first Grey Cup held since 1915, as Canadian football had been suspended due to the outbreak of the First World War.

The University of Toronto Varsity Blues defeated the Toronto Argonauts 16–3.
