= William "Deacon" White =

William Deacon White
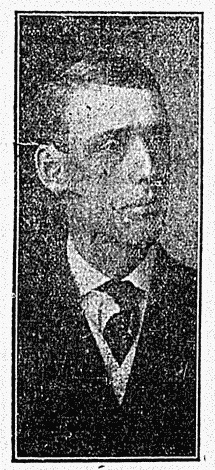
- Photo of Deacon White from The Edmonton Capital, February 10, 1911, pg. 6

Personal information
- Born: December 6, 1878; Sheridan, Illinois
- Died: November 1, 1939 (aged 60); Chicago, Illinois

Career history

Playing
- 1907: Edmonton Esquimaux

Coaching
- 1907–09: Edmonton Esquimaux
- 1910–13 1919–21 1923–24 1930: Edmonton Eskimos
- 1922: Edmonton Elks

Awards and highlights
- 1908, 13, 21, 22 - Alberta Rugby Football Championship

William Freeman "Deacon" White (December 6, 1878 – November 1, 1939) was an American educator and an athlete, coach, manager, owner and promoter of multiple sports, known as the "King of Sports" in Edmonton, Alberta, during the 1920s. His is remembered as founder of multiple sports teams and the first coach of the Edmonton Eskimos football team. A book-length biography of him called him "the founder of modern sports in Edmonton".

== Biography ==
White was born in Sheridan, Illinois, on 6 December 1878 and graduated with a master's degree from Northwestern University. There is no record of him playing intercollegiate sports there, but he is believed to have played intramural sports, and excelled at track, basketball, rugby, and baseball. He received the nickname "Deacon" because he was the son of a preacher, and possibly as an allusion to professional baseball player James Laurie "Deacon" White.

He began his working life as a professor in mathematics at the University of Chicago, but was involved with sports from soon after his graduation, and coached the St. Alban's Military Academy in Chicago to a state baseball championship.

He moved to Iowa in 1903 to teach and coach baseball. He then moved into baseball full-time, coaching and managing teams in Wisconsin, Montana, and North Dakota. In the spring of 1906 he played for Spokane of the North-Western League for two months before an injury ended his season. He then formed a youth team from Anacortes, Washington, and took them on a tour of Western Canada. When the tour ended, White decided to return to Edmonton, after being recruited by a number of local boosters there (Frank Oliver, Frank Goode, Frank Gray, and others) hoping to found a professional baseball team.

White first need to create a professional league in which an Edmonton could play. He therefore became the primary organizer and founder of the Western Canada Baseball League which was founded in 1906, and the coach and chief promoter of Edmonton's team in the new league, the Legislators. This initial venture only lasted one year, however, so in 1908 he founded a four-team senior amateur league called the "Twilight League" and managed a team affiliated with the Edmonton Young Liberals Club, as well as playing first base for the Liberals.

In football, he became the Edmonton Esquimaux' first import player and also their coach. He led them to an Alberta Rugby Football Union championship in 1908.

In 1910 the Esquimaux changed their name to the Edmonton Eskimos (Elks for the 1922 season), and White was their coach. This team was the franchise predecessor to the publicly owned Edmonton Eskimo Rugby Club, established in 1948. He coached the senior team during three different periods, compiling a record of 21 wins, 11 losses and 1 tie. Most famously, he led the team to two Grey Cup finals, in 1921 and 1922. Though they lost both games, the Eskimos were the first western Canadian team to challenge for the Cup. In all, he coached 11 seasons, still an Eskimos franchise record.

He also was a player, coach and manager of Edmonton Eskimos baseball team. He also coached and managed the Edmonton Eskimos hockey club, taking them to the semi-finals of the Allan Cup in 1913.

== Honours ==
White was inducted into the Alberta Sport Hall of Fame & Museum in 1990.

He died at Chicago in November, 1939.
