= Hugh Gall =

Canadian gridiron football player (born 1888)

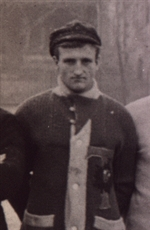

Profile
- Positions: Halfback, Punter

Personal information
- Born: ca 1888
- Died: May 19, 1938 (aged 49)

Career information
- University: University of Toronto

Career history

Playing
- 1907–1910: University of Toronto Varsity Blues
- 1913: Toronto Parkdale Canoe Club

Coaching
- 1914: University of Toronto Varsity Blues

Operations
- 1914–????: Secretary of Canadian Rugby Union
- 1920–1921: President of Canadian Rugby Union

Awards and highlights
- 2× Grey Cup champion (1909, 1910); 1909: Most singles in a Grey Cup game (8)
- Canadian Football Hall of Fame (Class of 1963)

Hugh Gall (c. 1888 – May 19, 1938) was a Canadian football player considered to be one of the best runners and punters of his era.

After playing half-back in Toronto for Parkdale Collegiate, Gall joined the University of Toronto varsity team in 1907 and played there for four seasons. He led the team to Grey Cup victories in 1909 and 1910, becoming the first team to win the new trophy presented to the Canadian Rugby Union champions. Gall set a record for most singles (single point kicks, also known as rouges) in a Grey Cup game with eight in 1909, a record that still stands (though somewhat asterisked, because he accomplished the feat before end zones were invented and as such as soon as the ball crossed the goal line it was dead and could not be returned). He was team captain for the 1910 season.

Gall also played in the Ontario Hockey Association for the Parkdale Canoe Club hockey team. In addition, he competed in several track meets in the Toronto area.

Gall was elected vice-commodore of the Parkdale Canoe Club in 1911 and then became a football referee. He returned to action in 1913, playing for the Parkdale team that lost in the Grey Cup final. Gall coached U of T to the intercollegiate championship in 1914 and graduated in 1915 with a degree in mechanical engineering.

He became secretary of the Canadian Rugby Union (now Football Canada) in 1914, and served a one-year term as president of the organization in 1920-1921. He died in Toronto at age 49 from pneumonia.

Gall was inducted into the Canadian Football Hall of Fame in 1963, Canada's Sports Hall of Fame in 1975, and the U of T Sports Hall of Fame in 1989.
