= Mike Rodden =

Canadian journalist, Hockey & CFL HOFamer (1891–1978)

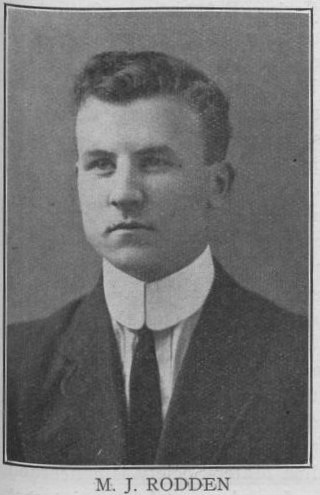
- Born: Michael James Rodden; April 24, 1891; Mattawa, Ontario, Canada
- Died: January 11, 1978 (aged 86); Toronto
- Occupations: sports journalist, National Hockey League referee, and football coach
- Honours: Hockey Hall of Fame (1962); Canadian Football Hall of Fame (1964)

Michael James Rodden (April 24, 1891 – January 11, 1978) was a Canadian sports journalist, National Hockey League referee, and Canadian football coach, and was the first person elected to both the Hockey Hall of Fame (1962) and the Canadian Football Hall of Fame (1964).

He was an older brother of ice hockey player Eddie Rodden.

== Biography ==
Born in Mattawa, Ontario, Rodden officiated in 1,187 National Hockey League games. As a football coach, he led the Hamilton Tigers to Grey Cup championships in 1928 and 1929. The Mike Rodden Arena and Community Centre in Mattawa is named in his honour.

Rodden's primary occupation was sports journalist. He started working at the Toronto Globe (now The Globe and Mail) as a reporter in 1918, rising to sports editor ten years later. He worked at the Globe for 18 years before moving to the Kingston Whig-Standard in 1936 when the Globe merged with The Mail and Empire. He remained sports editor there until 1958 and contributed a weekly column to the paper until a few weeks before his death in 1978 at age 86.

Rodden left his hometown at age 15 to attend the University of Ottawa. He was a student at Queen's University from 1910 to 1913, earning 15 letters in rugby football and ice hockey over that period. He went on to play football for Toronto Parkdale (1915) and the Toronto Argonauts (1919–1920). He also coached both teams, and was head coach of the Tigers from 1927–1930 and in 1937.

In hockey, Rodden coached De La Salle College, a high school team, in the 1920–21 season. He coached the St. Andrew's College juniors in 1921–22 and St. Mary's in 1923–24. In 1925, he coached the University of Toronto Schools Rugby team to an undefeated season, winning the Canadian Interscholastic Championship. Rodden was coach of the Toronto St. Pats until his contract was terminated in January 1927, just before the club was sold and became the Maple Leafs. He is credited with coaching two games by the NHL. At the same time, he was working as a referee for the Ontario Hockey Association.

After he retired, Rodden wrote a 500-page book about his several careers. He also eventually became an honored NHL member referee.

== Coaching record ==
=== IFRU coaching record ===
Team	Year	Regular Season					Post Season		
Team	Year	Won	Lost	Ties	Win %	Finish	Won	Lost	Result
TOR	1920	5	1	0	.833	1st, IRFU	1	1	Lost in Grey Cup
TOR	1926	3	3	0	.500	3rd, IRFU	-	-	Missed playoffs
HAM	1927	5	1	0	.833	1st, IRFU	1	1	Lost in Grey Cup
HAM	1928	6	0	0	1.000	1st, IRFU	2	0	Won Grey Cup
HAM	1929	5	1	0	.833	1st, IRFU	3	0	Won Grey Cup
HAM	1930	4	0	2	.833	1st, IRFU	1	1	Lost in East Final
HAM	1937	2	4	0	.333	3rd, IRFU	-	-	Missed playoffs
Total		30	10	2	.738	5 IFRU; Championships	-	-	2 Grey Cups

=== NHL coaching record ===
Team	Year	Regular Season							Post Season
Team	Year	G	W	L	T	OTL	Pts	Finish	Result
TOR	1926–27	2	0	2	0	-	(35)	5th in Canadian	(fired)

Preceded by Charles Querrie	Head coach of the Toronto St. Patricks; 1927	Succeeded by Alex Romeril
