= 1st Grey Cup =

1909 Canadian Football championship game

| Toronto Varsity | Toronto Parkdale |
|---|---|
| (6–0) | (3–1) |
| 26 | 6 |
| Head coach: Harry Griffith | Head coach: Eddie Livingstone |
| | 1 | 2 | 3 | 4 | Total |
|---|---|---|---|---|---|
| Toronto Varsity | 6 | 0 | 10 | 10 | 26 |
| Toronto Parkdale | 0 | 5 | 1 | 0 | 6 |
- Date: December 4, 1909; 116 years ago
- Stadium: Rosedale Field
- Location: Rosedale, Toronto
- Referee: W.B. Hendry
- Attendance: 3,807

The 1st Grey Cup was an inter-league championship game played on December 4, 1909, between the Intercollegiate Rugby Football Union champion Toronto Varsity and the Ontario Rugby Football Union champion Toronto Parkdale Canoe Club. The University of Toronto won the game, 26–6.

While the Canadian Dominion Football Championship had been contested since 1884, this was the first such game that was awarded the Grey Cup trophy. This was the University of Toronto's third Dominion Championship and their fifth appearance in the national championship game. This was Toronto Parkdale's first appearance in a Dominion Championship game.

== Background ==
=== Playoff structure ===
According to the rules set by the Canadian Rugby Union (CRU), the champions of the Interprovincial Rugby Football Union, Intercollegiate Rugby Football Union, and Ontario Rugby Football Union engaged in a playoff to determine the Dominion champion. Upon the creation of the Grey Cup itself, it was believed that the trophy would be awarded to the winners of an Interprovincial-Intercollegiate game. However, since the CRU had stated that the ORFU was a senior league, based on this year's rotation, the winner of the Interprovincial-Intercollegiate game had to play the champion of the ORFU, on their home field, for the Grey Cup. The rotational bye and subsequent hosting of the championship game had been in place since the creation of the Interprovincial Rugby Football Union in 1907.

=== Dominion Semi-Final ===
In the Dominion Semi-Final, Toronto Varsity hosted the Ottawa Rough Riders at Rosedale Field on November 27, 1909. The game itself was the most attended game in football history in Canada at the time, with close to 10,000 paid tickets and over 12,000 fans in attendance, including standing room. Varsity defeated the Rough Riders convincingly, by a score of 31–7, and earned their place in the championship final.

== Game summary ==
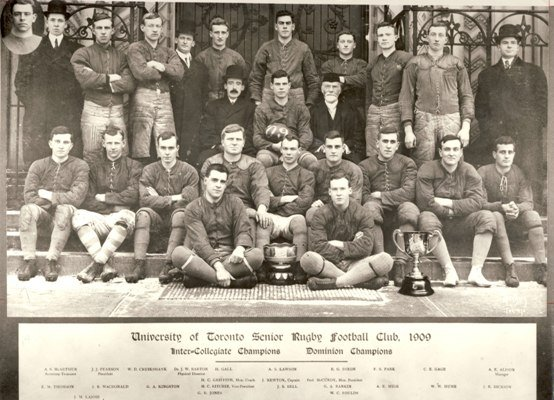
The 1909 Toronto Varsity team, inaugural champions. The Grey Cup is pictured at the front right.

While some had thought that Varsity would win handily, potentially by a score of 40–0, Parkdale kept the score close in the first half. After a series of fumbles and exchanges, Hugh Gall opened the scoring with a 65-yard single. Thereafter, Parkdale fumbled near their 10-yard line and Gall ran around the end for a try, with the convert failing. In the second quarter, deep in their own end, Varsity quarterback Billy Foulds lateralled back to Gall, but the pass missed and Parkdale's Tom Meighan jumped on the ball for the try. There was no more scoring in the half and Varsity held a 6–5 lead over Parkdale.

Early in the second half, Parkdale's Moore fumbled, which was dribbled by Varsity's Murray Thomson and recovered for a try. The convert by Bill Ritchie made the score 12–5. After a series of singles, mostly by Gall, the score was 16–6 for Varsity at the end of the third quarter. The fourth quarter featured five more singles for Varsity after a series of exchanges and the score became 21–6. Near the end of the game, Foulds passed the ball to Smirle Lawson who ran 50 yards for a try, just as the whistle was blown to signal the end of the game and no convert was attempted.

Toronto Varsity won their third Dominion championship after falling short in the previous year. Hugh Gall kicked eight singles which remains a Grey Cup record.

=== Scoring summary ===
Toronto Varsity (26) - TDs, Hugh Gall, Murray Thomson, Smirle Lawson; cons., Bill Ritchie; singles, Gall (8), Lawson (2).

Toronto Parkdale Canoe Club (6) - TD, Tom Meighan; single, Percy Killaly.

=== Scoring by quarter ===
First quarter

TV – Single Gall 65 yards 1–0 TV
TV – Try Gall 10-yard run (Convert failed) 6–0 TV

Second quarter

TP – Try Meighan in-goal fumble return (Convert failed) 6–5 TV

Third quarter

TV – Try Thomson 40-yard fumble return (Ritchie convert) 12–5 TV
TV – Single Gall 50 yards 13–5 TV
TV – Single Lawson 45 yards 13–5 TV
TP – Single Killaly 30 yards 13–6 TV
TV – Single Gall 55 yards 14–6 TV
TV – Single Gall 45 yards 16–6 TV

Fourth quarter

TV – Single Gall 40 yards 17–6 TV
TV – Single Gall 60 yards 18–6 TV
TV – Single Gall 35 yards 19–6 TV
TV – Single Gall 40 yards 20–6 TV
TV – Single Lawson 55 yards 21–6 TV
TV – Try Lawson 50–yard run (No convert attempted) 26–6 TV

== Aftermath ==
While this was the first Dominion Championship to be awarded the Grey Cup, no trophy was presented at the game itself. Allegedly, Albert Grey, 4th Earl Grey, the Governor General of Canada, who was donating the trophy, forgot to place the order to have the Grey Cup made. Two weeks prior to the game, silversmiths were notified to craft the sterling silver cup, on a wooden base, but it was not ready in time for the game. Instead, the Grey Cup was presented to the University of Toronto in March 1910.

== See also ==
- "Grey Cup 1909". Canadian Football League. Archived from the original on 2008-12-07.
- "The Grey Cup 1909-2009" (PDF). Canadian Football League. Archived from the original (PDF) on 2 December 2010.
