= William C. Foulds =

Canadian gridiron football player (born 1887)

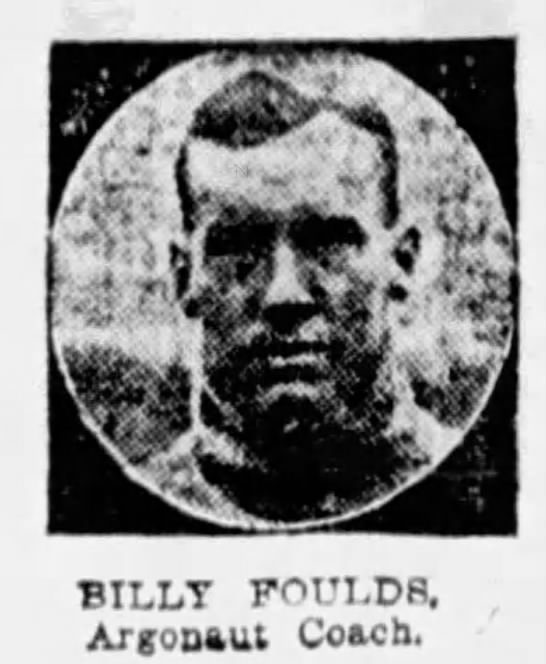
- Foulds pictured in 1911

Profile
- Position: Quarterback

Personal information
- Born: October 8, 1887
- Died: May 14, 1954 (aged 66)

Career history

Playing
- 1900s–1910: Toronto Varsity Blues
- 1911–1915: Toronto Argonauts

Coaching
- 1911, 1914, 1915: Toronto Argonauts

Awards and highlights
- 3× Grey Cup champion (1909, 1910, 1914)
- Canadian Football Hall of Fame

William C. Foulds (October 8, 1887 – May 14, 1954) was a Canadian football player, coach, referee, and administrator who was the head coach of the Toronto Argonauts for three seasons. He was the vice president of the CRU from 1933 to 1936 and was the president in 1921 and 1937. He was the head referee of the Big Four for a long time after his playing career was over. He died on May 14, 1954, at the age of 66. Foulds was a charter member of the Canadian Football Hall of Fame.

== Early life ==
Born in Quebec in 1887 to Archinald foulds sr and Mary cream foulds, William also known as Billy was the youngest of the family and he had an older brother by the name of Archibald Ernest Foulds (b.1882). Foulds graduated from the University of Toronto in 1910. While at the school he play for the school football team.

== Playing career ==
Foulds started his playing career with the Toronto Varsity Blues in the 1900s. He was with them when they won the 1st and 2nd Grey Cup. After 1910, he became the coach of the Toronto Argonauts following the retirement of Joe Lee. He would bring the Argonauts to the 3rd Grey Cup, but would lose to his former team, the Toronto Varsity Blues. He was their quarterback for the next few years and became their coach again in 1914. He was the co-coach in 1915 along with Warren Coryell. He later became a referee and was the head referee of the Big Four until his death in 1954.

== Later career ==
In 1921 and in 1937 he was the CRU president. He was their vice president from 1933 to 1936. He was also their chairman for a long time. He was a charter member for the Canadian Football Hall of Fame in 1963.

== Death ==
Foulds died on May 14, 1954, at the age of 66 from a heart attack.
