= Sinc McEvenue =

Canadian football coach

Sinclair McEvenue, known as "Sinc", was a Canadian football coach who was the head coach of Toronto Argonauts in 1919 and 1921. He was the head coach of the Argonaut team that won the 1921 Grey Cup.
