= Hamilton Alerts =

General information
- Founded: 1911; 115 years ago
- Folded: 1913; 113 years ago
- Stadium: Hamilton Amateur Athletic Association Grounds
- Headquartered: Hamilton, Ontario, Canada
- Colours: Garnet, Grey

Personnel
- Head coach: Liz Marriott

League / conference affiliations
- Ontario Rugby Football Union

Championships
- Grey Cup wins: 1; 1912

The Hamilton Alerts were a Canadian football-rugby union team based in Hamilton, Ontario that played in the Ontario Rugby Football Union from 1911 to 1912. The club won the 4th Grey Cup in 1912, becoming the first ever team from Hamilton to win the Grey Cup and the first team from the ORFU to win the Cup.

== History ==
While the club won the Grey Cup in 1912, it was controversial. The Alerts were suspended by the Ontario Rugby Football Union on November 23, 1912, one week before the Grey Cup game, after questioning the Union's authority. After the Toronto Rowing and Athletic Club protested a questionable penalty call in a Hamilton Alert's victory, the ORFU ordered the Alerts to replay the game on November 23. The Alerts lost the rematch 39–7, mainly because they used junior players, while the main squad played the Hamilton Tigers in a regularly scheduled match – which the Alerts won 12–8. The Alerts proceeded to defeat the Toronto Argonauts in the Grey Cup the following week.

The Alerts tried to rejoin the ORFU with a formal request on September 6, 1913, but were denied reinstatement. This, along with the previous season's indiscretion, led many players to join the Hamilton Tigers of the Interprovincial Rugby Football Union in time for the 1913 season. What was left of the Alerts operated separately from any union for several years until they disbanded altogether.

In 1940, several ORFU teams disbanded during the war, and several more were quickly thrown together to ensure a season was played. The team from Hamilton was nicknamed the "Alerts" by the press, but was not a descendant or continuation of the original team: they won 1 of 5 games in 1940.

In 1941, Hamilton's place in the ORFU would be filled by the Hamilton Wildcats, who played through 1949 before merging with the Tigers to form the modern-day Hamilton Tiger-Cats.

== Canadian Football Hall of Famers ==
- Ross Craig

== ORFU season-by-season ==
Season	W	L	T	PF	PA	Pts	Finish	Playoffs
1911	5	0	0	151	25	10	1st, ORFU	Lost East Semi-Final
1912	3	1	0	67	21	6	tied 1st, ORFU	Won 4th Grey Cup
1940	1	4	1	28	64	2	3rd, ORFU	

== Bibliography ==
- Football Canada
