= Ross Binkley =

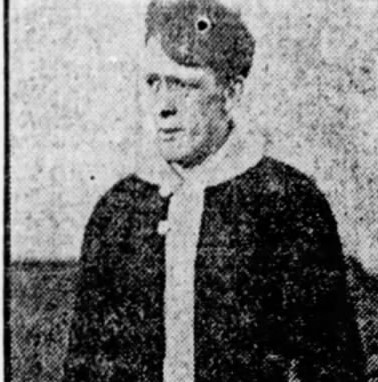

Profile
- Positions: Punter, Placekicker

Personal information
- Born: December 3, 1883; Dundas, Ontario, Canada
- Died: April 23, 1915 (aged 31); France †
- Listed weight: 188 lb (85 kg)

Career history

Playing
- 1907–1909: Dundas Rugby Team
- 1910–1913/1914: Toronto Argonauts

Coaching
- 1913: Toronto Argonauts

General Manager
- 1911/1912–1913: Toronto Argonauts

James Ross Binkley (December 3, 1883 – April 23, 1915) was a Canadian football player, coach, and manager who was the head coach of the Toronto Argonauts in 1913. He was their team captain from 1910 to 1913.

== Early life ==
Ross Binkley was born on December 3, 1883, in Dundas, Ontario.

== Professional career ==
=== Dundas Rugby Team ===
He started his career with the Dundas Rugby Team in 1907. He was team captain as they won the Intermediate Dominion Championship in 1907.

=== Toronto Argonauts ===
In 1910 he became the team captain for the Toronto Argonauts. He was their general manager in the next few years and their coach in 1913. He stopped after 1914.

== Death ==
Binkley was killed in action on April 23, 1915, at the age of 31 in France. He was reportedly "blown to pieces" while operating a machine gun.
