= 4th Grey Cup =

1912 Canadian Football championship game

Toronto Argonauts	Hamilton Alerts
(5–1)	(3–1)
4	11
Head coach: Jack Newton	Head coach: Liz Marriott
	1	2	3	4	Total
Toronto Argonauts	0	2	0	2	4
Hamilton Alerts	2	2	7	0	11
- Date: November 30, 1912
- Stadium: AAA Grounds
- Location: Hamilton
- Attendance: 5,337

The 4th Grey Cup was played on November 30, 1912, before 5,337 fans at the AAA Grounds in Hamilton, Ontario.

The Hamilton Alerts defeated the Toronto Argonauts 11–4 to win their only Grey Cup.
