= 10th Grey Cup =

1922 Canadian Football championship game

Edmonton Elks	Queen's University
	(3–1)
1	13
Head coach: William "Deacon" White	Head coach: Billy Hughes
	1	2	3	4	Total
Edmonton Elks	0	1	0	0	1
Queen's University	0	0	8	5	13
- Date: December 2, 1922
- Stadium: Richardson Memorial Stadium
- Location: Kingston
- Referee: Silver Quilty
- Attendance: 4,700

The 10th Grey Cup was played on December 2, 1922, before 4,700 fans at Richardson Memorial Stadium at Kingston.

Queen's University defeated the Edmonton Elks 13–1.

The match was refereed by Silver Quilty.
