= 6th Grey Cup =

1914 Canadian Football championship game

| Toronto Argonauts | Toronto Varsity Blues |
|---|---|
| (5–1) | (3–1) |
| 14 | 2 |
| Head coach: Billy Foulds | Head coach: Hugh Gall |
| | 1 | 2 | 3 | 4 | Total |
|---|---|---|---|---|---|
| Toronto Argonauts | 6 | 8 | 0 | 0 | 14 |
| Toronto Varsity Blues | 0 | 0 | 2 | 0 | 2 |
- Date: December 5, 1914
- Stadium: Varsity Stadium
- Location: Toronto
- Attendance: 10,500

The 6th Grey Cup was played on December 5, 1914, before 10,500 fans at Varsity Stadium at Toronto.

The Toronto Argonauts defeated the University of Toronto Varsity Blues 14–2.
