= 1912 in Canadian football =

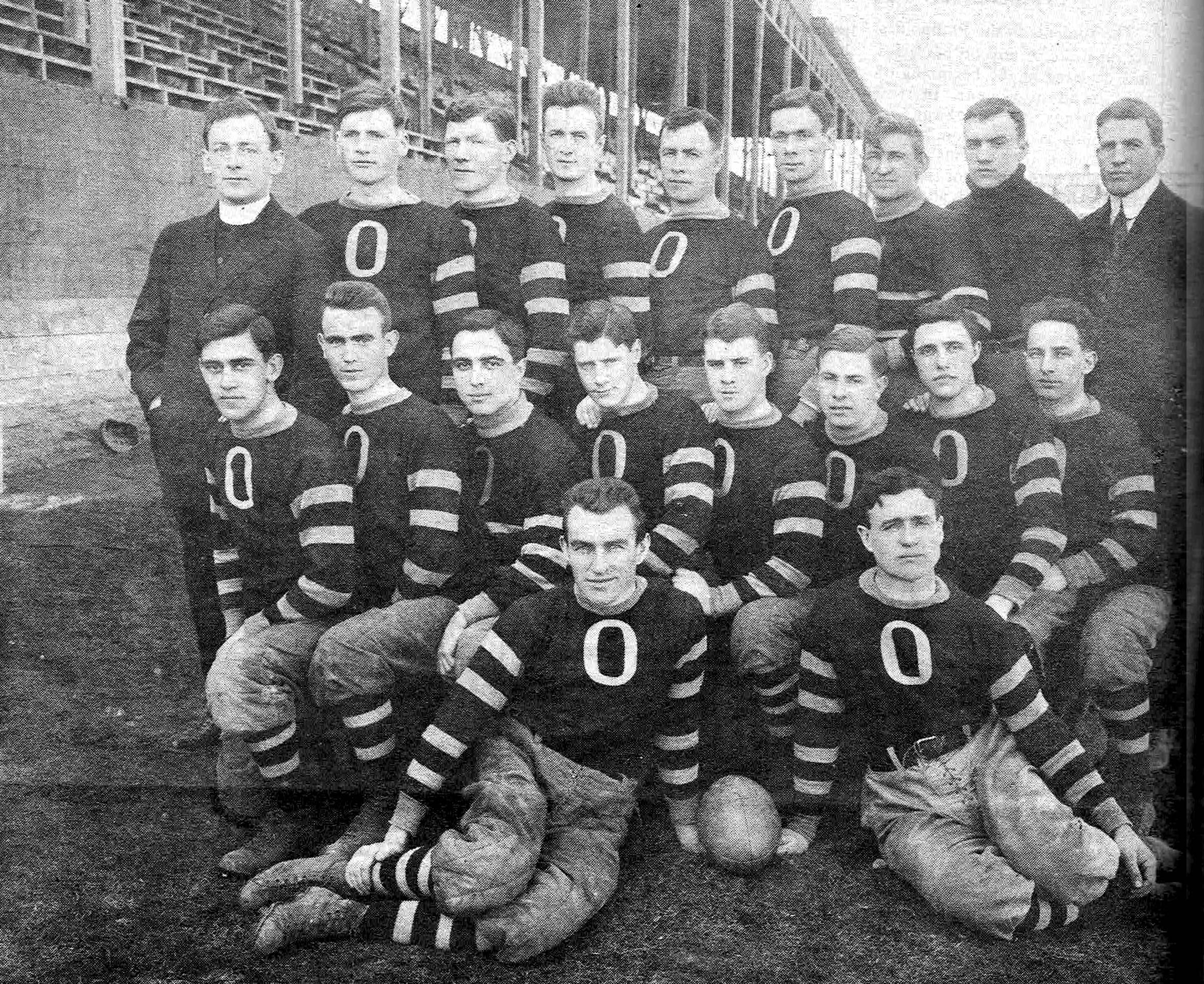
Ottawa Gee-Gees football team in 1912

== Canadian football news in 1912 ==
The Regina Rugby Club adopted red and black as their jersey colours, one explanation being that these were the colours of the (supposed) Canadian contingent with Teddy Roosevelt's Rough Riders in the Spanish–American War. They also agreed to play in the Western playoffs as SRFU champion for the first time, after the Western Canada Rugby Football Union agreed to change the format so that the Saskatchewan champion would receive a bye to the Western final in exchange for the semi-final winner having the right to host the game. Regina would go in to win every Western championship contested from 1912 until 1920.

The Hamilton Alerts were suspended by the ORFU on November 23 for flaunting the authority of the Union. The Toronto Rowing and Athletic Club had protested a penalty call which had resulted in a victory for the Alerts. The ORFU ordered the game be re-played on the 23rd, but the Alerts refused to field a full team. The Alerts lost to Toronto, 39–7, while the main squad lost a regularly scheduled match in Hamilton to the Tigers, 12–8. The Alerts went on to defeat the Toronto Argonauts, 11–4, in the Grey Cup game. Many of the players joined the Tigers of IRFU the following season.

McGill University ended Varsity's reign as Grey Cup champions in 1912, but refused to challenge for the trophy because the students didn't want to take time away from their studies.

== Regular season ==
=== Final regular season standings ===
Note: GP = Games played, W = Wins, L = Losses, T = Ties, PF = Points for, PA = Points against, Pts = Points

**Interprovincial Rugby Football Union**
Team	GP	W	L	T	PF	PA	Pts
**Toronto Argonauts**	6	5	1	0	78	56	10
Ottawa Rough Riders	6	4	2	0	77	65	8
Hamilton Tigers	6	3	3	0	90	66	6
Montreal Football Club	6	0	6	0	54	112	0

Ontario Rugby Football Union
Team	GP	W	L	T	PF	PA	Pts
**Hamilton Alerts**	4	3	1	0	85	54	6
**Toronto Rowing and Athletic Association**	3	2	1	0	64	29	4
Parkdale Canoe Club	3	0	3	0	16	81	0

**Intercollegiate Rugby Football Union**
Team	GP	W	L	T	PF	PA	Pts
**McGill Redmen**	4	3	1	0	70	41	6
**Varsity Blues**	4	3	1	0	59	55	6
Queen's University	4	0	4	0	22	55	0

- Bold text means that they had clinched the playoffs.

Manitoba Rugby Football Union
Team	GP	W	L	T	PF	PA	Pts
Winnipeg Rowing Club	5	3	1	1	54	28	7
St.John's Rugby Football Club	5	1	3	1	28	54	3

Saskatchewan Rugby Football Union
Team	GP	W	L	T	PF	PA	Pts
Regina Rugby Club	4	3	1	0	50	45	6
Moose Jaw Tigers	4	2	2	0	45	39	4
Saskatoon Rugby Club	4	1	3	0	36	47	2

Alberta Rugby Football Union
Team	GP	W	L	T	PF	PA	Pts
Calgary Tigers *	4	3	1	0	73	19	6
Edmonton Eskimos	4	3	1	0	55	20	6
Calgary YMCA	4	0	4	0	3	92	0

* Calgary Tigers awarded first place based on 20-16 score in head-to-head games

== League Champions ==
Football union	League Champion
IRFU	Toronto Argonauts
WCRFU	Regina Rugby Club
CIRFU	McGill University
ORFU	Hamilton Alerts
MRFU	Winnipeg Rowing Club
SRFU	Regina Rugby Club
ARFU	Calgary Tigers

== Grey Cup playoffs ==
Note: All dates in 1912

=== Western semifinal ===
Date	Away	Home
November 2	Calgary Tigers 3	Winnipeg Rowing Club 4

=== Western Final - SRFU–MRFU Inter-League Playoff ===
Date	Away	Home
November 9	Regina Rugby Club 5	Winnipeg Rowing Club 0

=== ORFU Playoff ===
Date	Away	Home
November 23	Toronto Rowing and Athletic Association 10	Hamilton Alerts 23

- Hamilton advances to the Grey Cup.

=== East final ===
Date	Away	Home
November 23	Toronto Argonauts 22	Toronto Varsity Blues 16

- Toronto Argonauts advance to the Grey Cup.

== Playoff bracket ==
Quarterfinals
CIRFU	University of Toronto	3
CIRFU	McGill University	14

Semifinals
IRFU	Toronto Argonauts	22
CIRFU	University of Toronto	16
ORFU	Hamilton Alerts	23
ORFU	Toronto Rowing Club	10

Grey Cup final
IRFU	Toronto Argonauts	4
ORFU	Hamilton Alerts	11

== Grey Cup Championship ==
November 30 4th Annual Grey Cup Game: A.A.A. Grounds – Hamilton, Ontario
Toronto Argonauts 4	Hamilton Alerts 11
Hamilton Alerts are the 1912 Grey Cup Champions.
