= 11th Grey Cup =

1923 Canadian Football championship game

Regina Rugby Club	Queen's University
(3–1)	(4–0)
0	54
Head coach: Jack Eadie	Head coach: Billy Hughes
	1	2	3	4	Total
Regina Rugby Club	0	0	0	0	0
Queen's University	7	13	23	11	54
- Date: December 1, 1923
- Stadium: Varsity Stadium
- Location: Toronto
- Attendance: 8,629

The 11th Grey Cup was played on December 1, 1923, before 8,629 fans at Varsity Stadium in Toronto.

Queen's University shut out the Regina Rugby Club 54–0, the biggest Grey Cup victory margin ever achieved.
