= Rivermead Golf Club =

Quebec golf club

Coordinates: 45.39681°N 75.79146°W

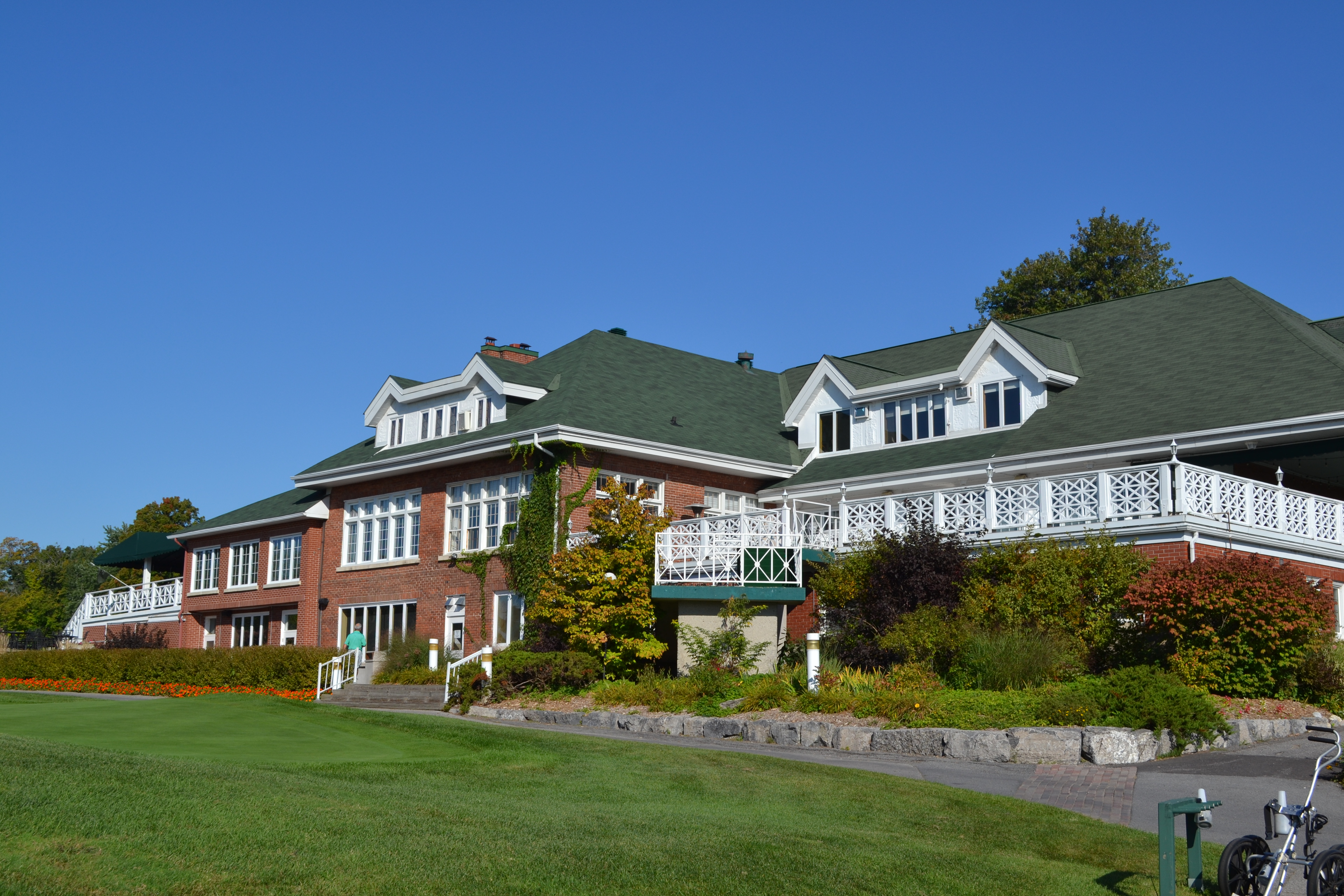
- Clubhouse of Rivermead Golf Club, a Recognized Historic Place in Canada
- Interactive map of Rivermead Golf Club

Club information
- Location: Aylmer, Quebec, Canada
- Type: Private
- Total holes: 18
- Designed by: Charles Murray (1911), George Cumming (1915), Ken Skodacek (1989)
- Par: 72 (men) / 75 (women)
- Length: 6,559 yards (max)

Rivermead Golf Club is a private, 18 hole golf club in Aylmer, Quebec (now part of Gatineau). It is located 10 minutes from downtown Gatineau/Ottawa and is one of the oldest clubs in the National Capital Region. In 2010, the club celebrated its centennial anniversary.

== History ==
Rivermead Golf Club was established in 1910 and opened in 1911 as a nine-hole course, under the direction of architect Charles Murray. The course was expanded to 18 holes in 1915 following the purchase of additional land in 1912. George Cumming directed the expansion.

Throughout its first 100 years, Rivermead Golf Club has hosted many national, provincial and local championship events, including:

- 1920 Canadian Open, won by James Douglas Edgar
- 1925 Canadian Women's Amateur, won by Ada Mackenzie
- 1932 Canadian PGA Championship, won by Lex Robson
- 1959 Canadian PGA Championship, won by Stan Leonard
- 1963 Canadian Junior Girls Championship, won by Cathy Galusha
- 2005 CN Canadian Women's Tour, won by Linda Shephard
- 2010 CN Canadian Women's Tour, won by Candace Schepperle

In 1948, Rivermead, along with the Ottawa Hunt and Royal Ottawa golf clubs, formed the Ottawa District Golf Association, which became the Ottawa Valley Golf Association in 1981. The three clubs (in rotation) have hosted the Alexander of Tunis tournament every three years since its inception in 1950.

In 1989, golf course architect Ken Skodacek (working with Ken Venturi) modernized and re-designed the course resulting in the present course layout. The golf course is par 72 for men and par 75 for women. The course yardage varies from 5,359 to 6,559 yards. In 2008, the Club spent $2.4 million to refurbish the clubhouse facility and to create a new outdoor patio overlooking the 18th green. In 2010, as part of its centennial celebrations, the club dedicated a bridge near the 18th green to commemorate the milestone and to honour past and current members.

== Rivermead Cup ==
Rivermead Golf Club donated the Rivermead Cup to the Royal Canadian Golf Association in 1920. It was awarded to the Canadian Open champion until 1935, when the RCGA obtained a sponsor and a new trophy. The Rivermead Cup is now awarded annually to the low Canadian in the RBC Canadian Open.

=== Rivermead Cup winners ===
- 2005 Stephen Ames
- 2006 David Hearn
- 2007 Stephen Ames
- 2008 Mike Weir
- 2009 Chris Baryla, Stephen Ames
- 2010 Adam Hadwin
- 2011 Adam Hadwin
- 2012 Graham DeLaet
- 2013 David Hearn
- 2014 Graham DeLaet
- 2015 David Hearn
- 2016 Adam Hadwin
- 2017 Mackenzie Hughes

== See also ==
- List of golf courses in Quebec
