= Florence Harvey =

Canadian golfer and WWI ambulance driver (1878–1968)

Florence Lyle Harvey
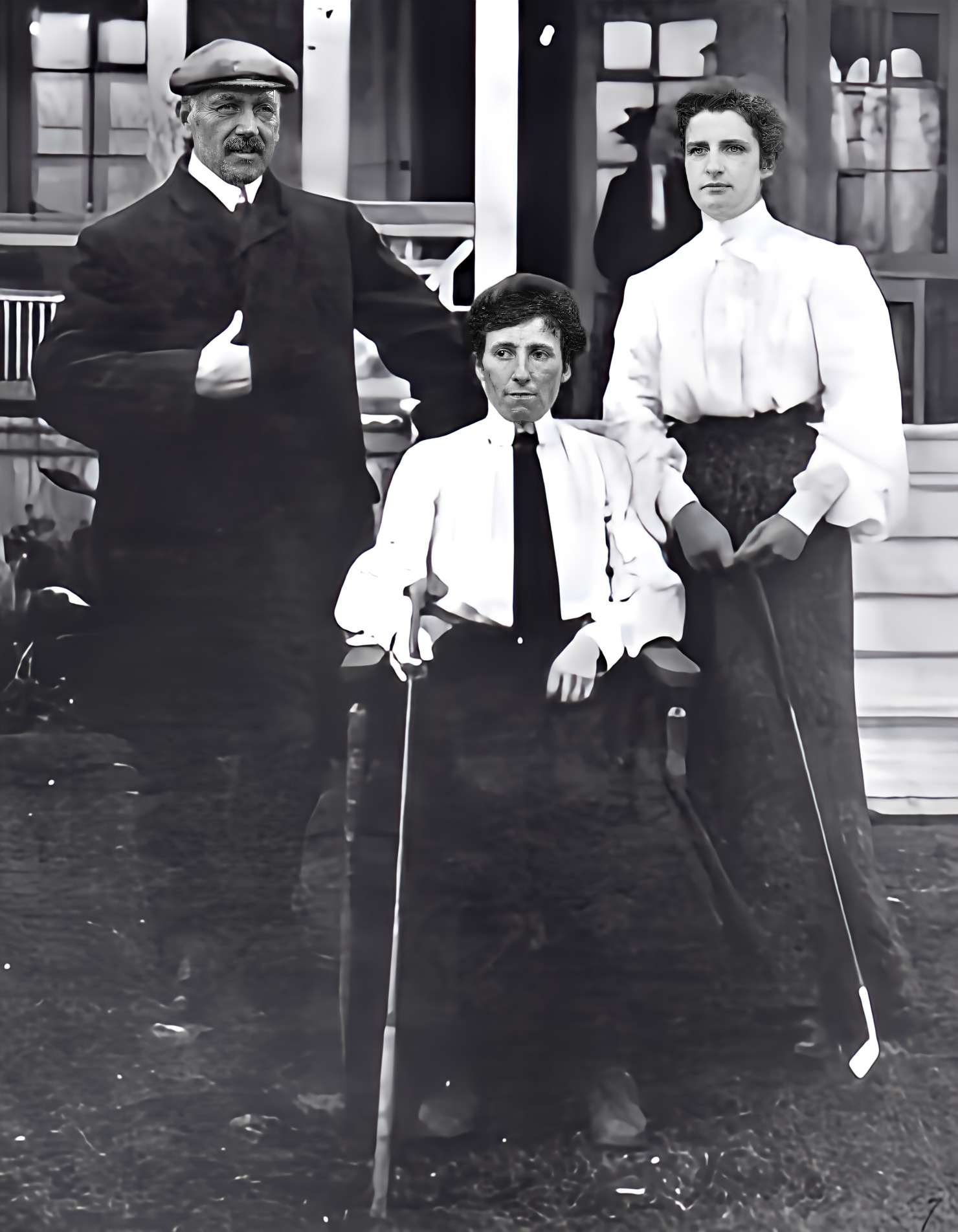
- George S. Lyon, Mabel Thomson, and Florence Harvey, all Canadian golf champions, from a 1909 publication.
- Born: November 10, 1878
- Died: 1968; Ancaster, Ontario
- Occupation: golfer

Florence Lyle Harvey (November 10, 1878 – 1968) was a Canadian golfer and an ambulance driver in Serbia during World War I. She was inducted into the Canadian Golf Hall of Fame in 1972.

== Early life ==
Harvey was the daughter of John and Williamina Harvey; both parents were born in Scotland. She was raised in Hamilton, Ontario.

== Career ==
Harvey won the Canadian Ladies' Amateur Championship twice, in 1903 and 1904, and was runner-up in the same competition in 1911 and 1913. She won the 1914 North and South Women's Amateur Golf Championship and was also Ontario Ladies' Amateur Champion in 1904, 1906, 1913 and 1914. In 1910 she was a semi-finalist in an international Ladies' Championship, defeated by fellow Canadian Dorothy Campbell. She competed in the British Ladies Amateur Championship in 1911, 1912, 1913, and 1920.

In 1911, Harvey accepted an invitation to play in the inaugural Berthellyn Cup tournament at the Huntingdon Valley Country Club in Philadelphia. Her qualifying medal score of 105, in terrible playing conditions, allowed her to advance to the match play rounds. She lost in the quarterfinals to Philadelphia golfing legend Mrs. Ronald H. Barlow, 3 and 2.

Harvey applied for a patent on a process of manufacturing golf balls in 1912. She was a founder of the Canadian Ladies' Golf Union (CLGU) in 1913, and served as secretary of the organization. She organized Canadian women's golf into three regional divisions, subdivided into districts. In 1963, she attended the CLGU's 50th anniversary event at Rivermead Golf Club.

During World War I, Harvey worked on fundraising efforts among women golfers to buy an ambulance. Harvey was a Red Cross volunteer ambulance driver in Vranje and Belgrade in 1918 and 1919, working with a Scottish Women's Hospital unit. Writing about her experiences, she commented, "The screams of a woman at any time are awful, but the screams of a man you never forget to your dying day." She wrote a monthly column called "Golfing Hints" for Golfers Magazine in 1919.

During World War II she was in England with the Canadian Red Cross.

== Personal life ==
Harvey moved to South Africa and raised poultry on a farm with her friend from the war, Marjorie Pope-Ellis. She returned to Canada in 1954, and died in Ancaster, Ontario in 1968, aged 89 years. In 1972, she was inducted into the Canadian Golf Hall of Fame. She was also inducted into the Ontario Golf Hall of Fame in 2000, and the Hamilton Sports Hall of Fame in 2012.

== Amateur wins ==
- 1903 Canadian Women's Amateur
- 1904 Canadian Women's Amateur, Ontario Ladies' Amateur
- 1906 Ontario Ladies' Amateur
- 1913 Ontario Ladies' Amateur
- 1914 North and South Women's Amateur, Ontario Ladies' Amateur
