= Bobbie Rosenfeld Award =

Canadian athletics award

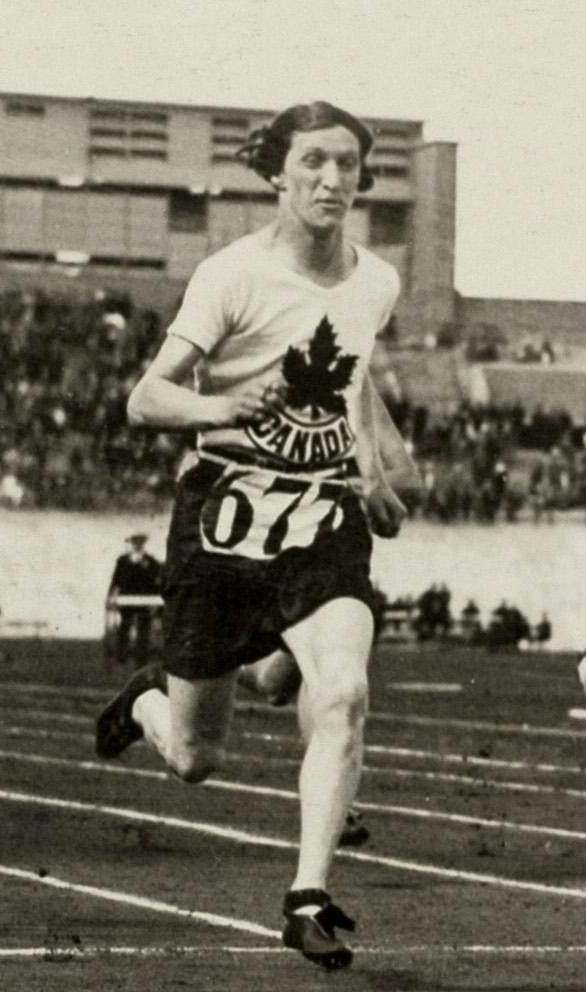
Named Canada's female athlete of the half-century in 1950, Bobbie Rosenfeld was an Olympic track and field champion as well as a top hockey, basketball and tennis player.

The Bobbie Rosenfeld Award is an annual award given to Canada's female athlete of the year. The sports writers of the Canadian Press (CP) first conducted a poll to determine the nation's top female in 1932, naming track star Hilda Strike the winner. The CP formalized the poll into an award in 1978, presenting their winner a plaque. It was named after Bobbie Rosenfeld, an all-around athlete and Olympic track and field champion whom the news organization had named its top athlete of the half-century in 1950. The award is separate from the Northern Star Award, in which a select panel of sports writers vote for their top overall athlete.

The poll was suspended for four years during the Second World War after the CP decided it could not name a sporting "hero" at a time when Canadian soldiers were fighting in Europe. Figure skater Barbara Ann Scott first set the record for consecutive wins by leading the poll three times from 1946 to 1948. That total was subsequently matched by swimmer Summer McIntosh in 2023–2025. Golfer Marlene Streit finished top of the poll the most times, winning on five occasions between 1952 and 1963.

The 2025 winner was swimmer Summer McIntosh.

== Voting ==
The CP first voted on a athletes of the year in 1932, the same year it inaugurated a poll that became the Lionel Conacher Award for the nation's top male athlete. The poll is separate from the previously existing Velma Springstead Trophy, which also names a female athlete of the year and was first presented by the Women's Amateur Athletic Federation of Canada in 1932.

Hilda Strike was selected the first winner on a straight vote of each writer's top choice. By 1935, the poll was conducted using a points system where voters ranked their top three choices. Each writer's top pick received three points, their second two, and their third one. A tie occurred in 1971 as pentathlete Debbie Van Kiekebelt and high jumper Debbie Brill finished with an identical 208 points. Van Kiekebelt had more first place votes, 55 to 38, however the two women were named co-winners of the award. Barbara Ann Scott was the first woman to unanimously win the award, doing so in 1947. Scott nearly duplicated the feat the following year, however the lone dissenting vote was given to a mare, Victory Gift.

No winner was selected for the year 1950, as the CP instead chose Bobbie Rosenfeld as Canada's female athlete of the half-century. Skier Nancy Greene was voted Canada's female athlete of the century in 1999. Greene was herself a two-time winner of the annual poll, and was also an Olympic gold medallist, six-time Canadian champion and twice won the Alpine World Cup. Voters selected their first disabled athlete as the winner in 2008, naming wheelchair racer Chantal Petitclerc the recipient of the Bobbie Rosenfeld Award after she won five gold medals and set three world records at the 2008 Summer Paralympics in Beijing. Golfers and swimmers have won the most awards with 14 each, followed by skiers (including biathlete Myriam Bédard) with 12. Figure skaters have 10 victories.

== List of winners ==
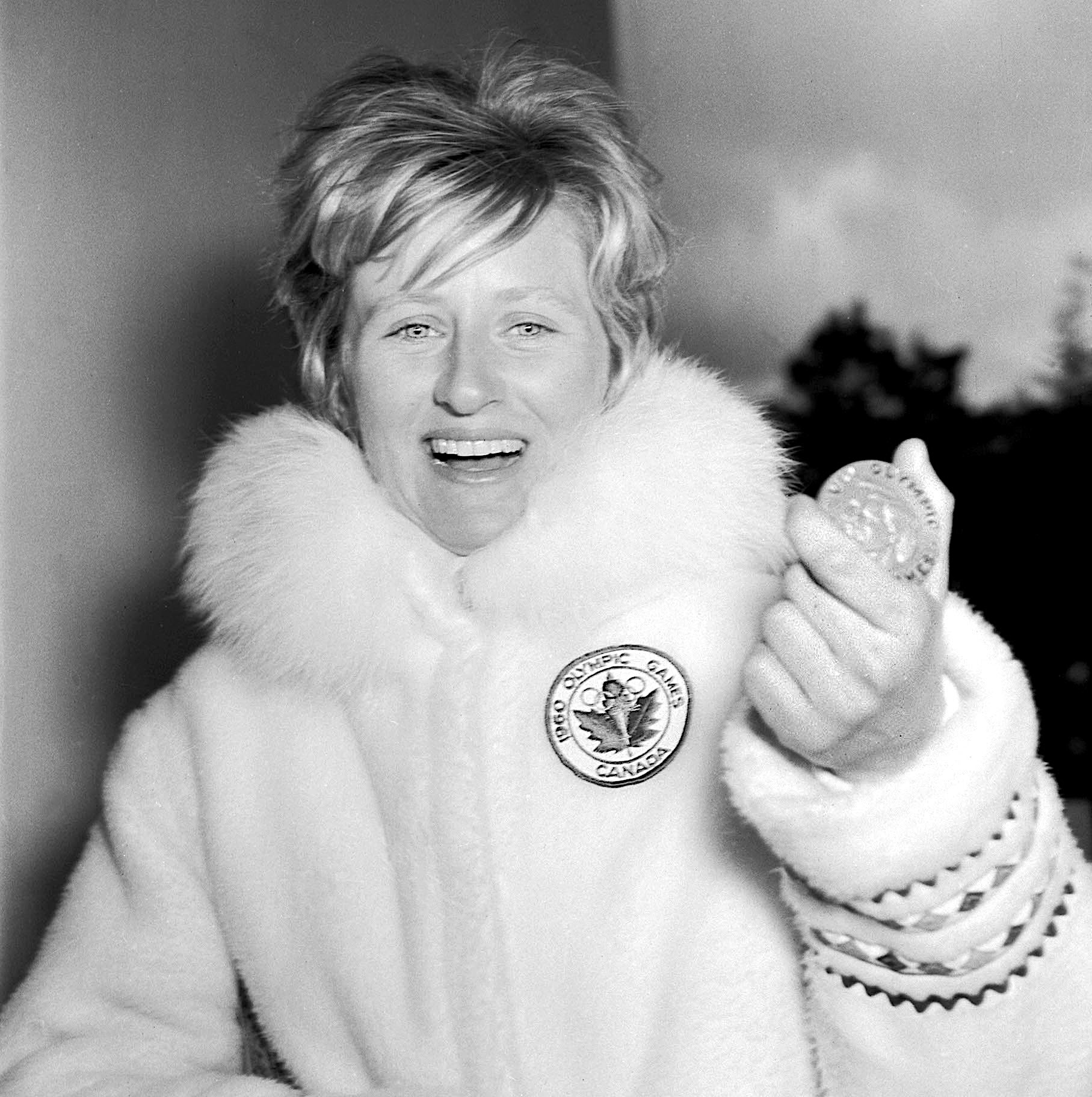
Anne Heggtveit was a two-time winner in the 1960s

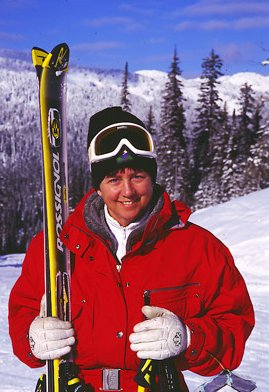
Nancy Green was a two-time winner and named Canada's athlete of the century

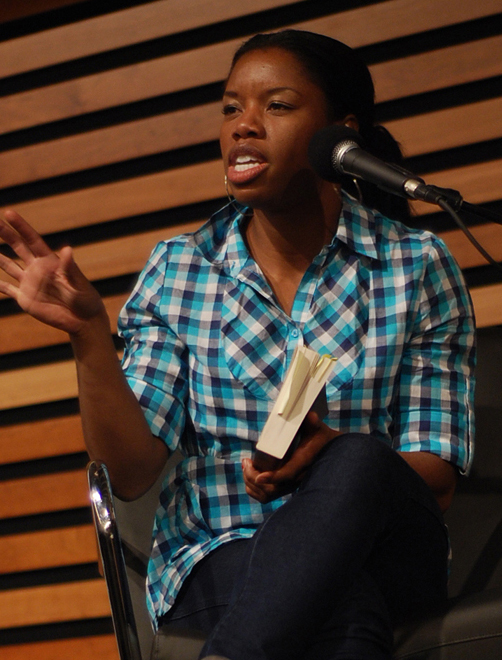
Perdita Felicien won in 2003

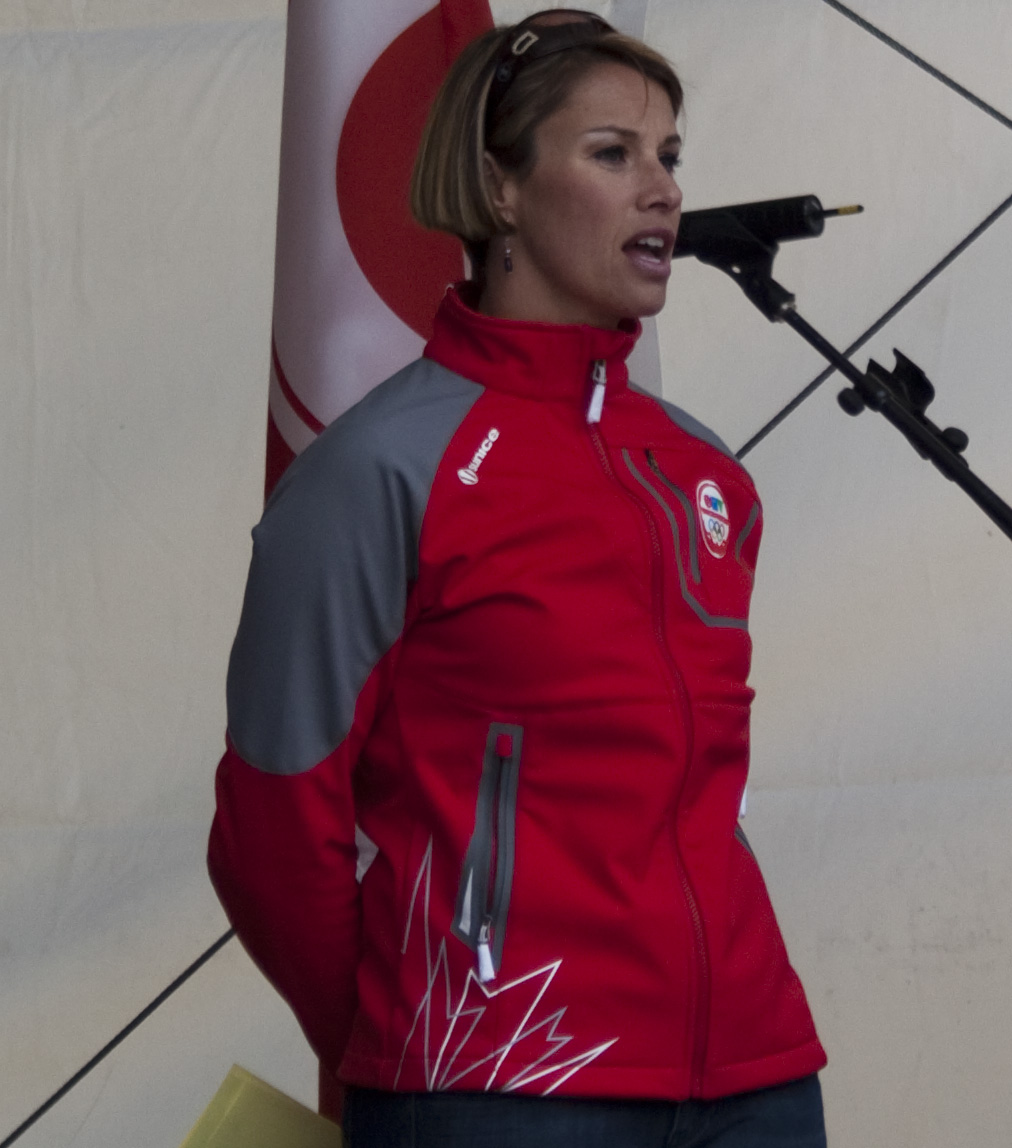
Catriona Le May Doan was a three-time winner

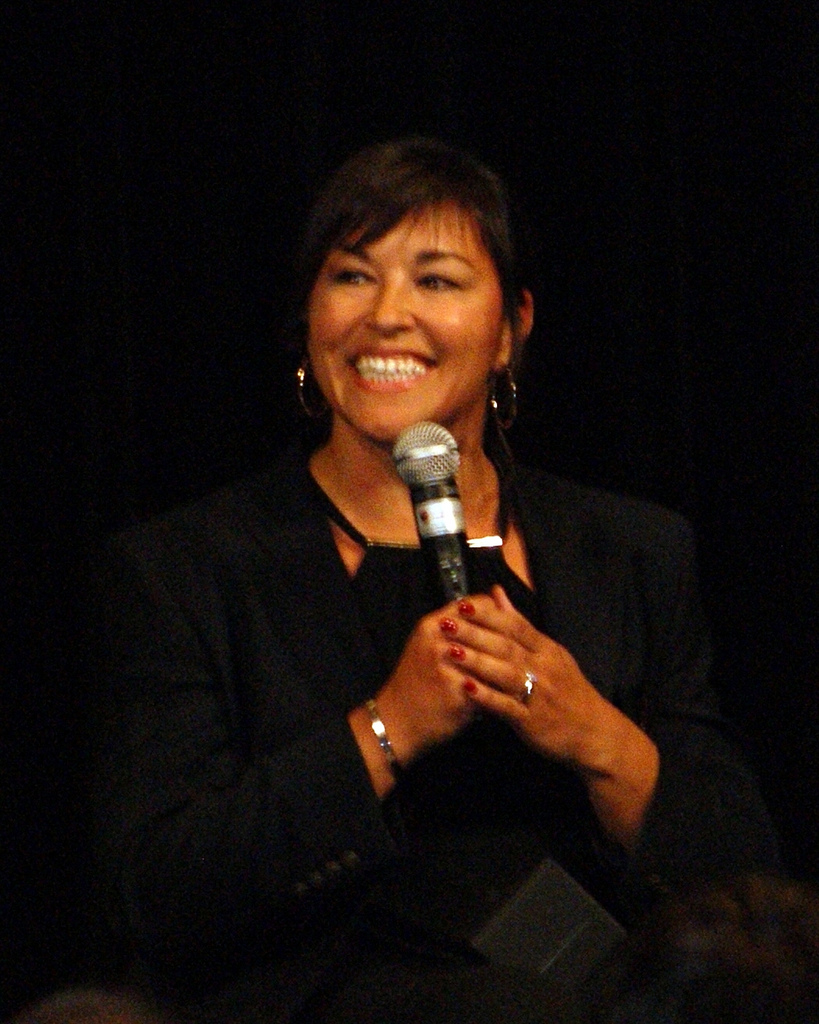
Chantal Petitclerc was the first disabled athlete to win the award in 2008

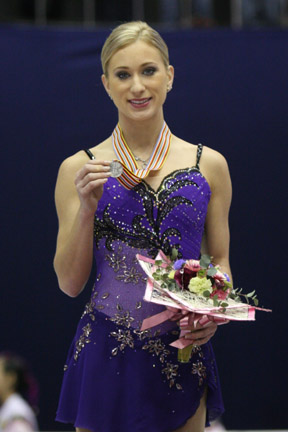
Joannie Rochette won the award in 2010

Year	Winner	Sport	Win #	Achievement
1932	Hilda Strike	Track and field	1	Silver medallist at the 1932 Summer Olympics
1933	Ada Mackenzie	Golf	1	Winner of Canadian Women's open and closed championships
1934	Phyllis Dewar	Swimming	1	Quadruple gold medallist at 1934 British Empire Games
1935	Aileen Meagher	Track and field	1	Considered Canada's top female sprinter
1936	Betty Taylor	Track and field	1	Bronze medallist at 1936 Summer Olympics
1937	Robina Higgins	Track and field	1	Set Canadian record in the javelin throw
1938	Noel MacDonald	Basketball	1	Captained her team to national championship.
1939	Mary Rose Thacker	Figure skating	1	Won North American championship
1940	Dorothy Walton	Badminton	1	Toronto, Ontario and Canadian champion
1941	Mary Rose Thacker	Figure skating	2	Won North American championship for third consecutive year
1942	No award (Second World War)^{[a]}			
1943	No award (Second World War)^{[a]}			
1944	No award (Second World War)^{[a]}			
1945	No award (Second World War)^{[a]}			
1946	Barbara Ann Scott	Figure skating	1	Canadian and North American champion
1947	Barbara Ann Scott^{[b]}	Figure skating	2	European and world champion
1948	Barbara Ann Scott^{[b]}	Figure skating	3	Gold medallist at the 1948 Winter Olympics, European and world champion
1949	Irene Strong	Swimming	1	Holder of numerous Canadian records
1950	Bobbie Rosenfeld; Athlete of the half-century^{[c]}	Track and field	—	Gold and silver medallist at the 1928 Summer Olympics, set records in numerous athletics events, also played hockey, basketball and tennis
1951	No award			
1952	Marlene Streit	Golf	1	Winner of Canadian Women's closed championship
1953	Marlene Streit	Golf	2	Winner of the British Ladies Amateur Golf Championship
1954	Marilyn Bell^{[b]}	Swimming	1	First person to swim across Lake Ontario
1955	Marilyn Bell	Swimming	2	Youngest person to swim across the English Channel
1956	Marlene Streit^{[b]}	Golf	3	Winner of eight tournaments, including U.S. Women's Amateur
1957	Marlene Streit	Golf	4	Winner of Canadian closed and Ontario amateur championships
1958	Lucille Wheeler^{[b]}	Skiing	1	Winner of downhill and slalom world championships
1959	Anne Heggtveit	Skiing	1	Winner of multiple European events
1960	Anne Heggtveit^{[b]}	Skiing	2	Gold medallist at the 1960 Winter Olympics
1961	Mary Stewart	Swimming	1	Set world record in 110-yard butterfly
1962	Mary Stewart	Swimming	2	Gold medallist at 1962 British Empire and Commonwealth Games
1963	Marlene Streit	Golf	5	Winner of three tournaments, including Canadian open and closed championships
1964	Petra Burka	Figure skating	1	Canadian champion and bronze medal winner at 1964 Winter Olympics
1965	Petra Burka^{[b]}	Figure skating	2	Winner of world championship
1966	Elaine Tanner^{[b]}	Swimming	1	Quadruple gold medallist at the 1966 British Empire and Commonwealth Games
1967	Nancy Greene^{[b]}	Skiing	1	Winner of the 1967 Alpine Skiing World Cup
1968	Nancy Greene^{[b]}	Skiing	2	Gold and bronze medallist at 1968 Winter Olympics and winner of the 1968 Alpine Skiing World Cup
1969	Beverly Boys	Diving	1	Canadian champion and winner of English diving championship
1970	Beverly Boys	Diving	2	Double gold medallist at the 1970 British Commonwealth Games
1971	Debbie Van Kiekebelt^{[d]}	Pentathlon	1	Gold medallist at 1971 Pan American Games
1971	Debbie Brill^{[d]}	High jump	1	Gold medallist at 1971 Pan American Games
1972	Jocelyne Bourassa	Golf	1	Top-20 finish in the LPGA Tour standings
1973	Karen Magnussen	Figure skating	1	Winner of world championship
1974	Wendy Cook	Swimming	1	Triple gold medallist at the 1974 British Commonwealth Games
1975	Nancy Garapick	Swimming	1	Set world record in the 200 metre backstroke
1976	Kathy Kreiner	Skiing	1	Gold medallist at the 1976 Winter Olympics
1977	Cindy Nicholas	Swimming	1	First woman and fastest person to complete a double crossing of the English Channel
1978	Diane Jones-Konihowski	Pentathlon	1	Gold medallist at the 1978 Commonwealth Games
1979	Sandra Post^{[b]}	Golf	1	Second on the LPGA Tour, earned more prize money in a single year than any previous Canadian golfer
1980	Sandra Post	Golf	2	Earned over US$100,000 on LPGA Tour
1981	Tracey Wainman	Figure skating	1	Winner of the St. Ivel International
1982	Gerry Sorensen	Skiing	1	Winner of the downhill world championship
1983	Carling Bassett	Tennis	1	Winner of one tournament and finalist in two others as first year professional
1984	Sylvie Bernier	Diving	1	Gold medallist at the 1984 Summer Olympics
1985	Carling Bassett	Tennis	2	Ranked 17th in the world by the Women's Tennis Association
1986	Laurie Graham	Skiing	1	Seven top-three finishes and third overall in downhill
1987	Carolyn Waldo	Synchronized swimming	1	Double gold medallist at World Aquatic Championships
1988	Carolyn Waldo^{[b]}	Synchronized swimming	2	Double gold medallist at the 1988 Summer Olympics
1989	Helen Kelesi	Tennis	1	Ranked 13th in the world by the Women's Tennis Association
1990	Helen Kelesi	Tennis	2	First woman to win four consecutive national senior championships
1991	Silken Laumann^{[b]}	Rowing	1	World champion in single skulls and World Cup winner
1992	Silken Laumann	Rowing	2	Won bronze medal at the 1992 Summer Olympics, less than three months after serious accident that doctors predicted would end her career
1993	Kate Pace	Skiing	1	Winner of the downhill world championship
1994	Myriam Bédard^{[b]}	Biathlon	1	Double gold medallist at 1994 Winter Olympics
1995	Susan Auch	Speed skating	1	Won silver and bronze medals at world championships, second overall in World Cup
1996	Alison Sydor	Cycling	1	Silver medallist at 1996 Summer Olympics, world champion and World Cup winner
1997	Lorie Kane	Golf	1	Earned Canadian record of US$426,000 on LPGA Tour
1998	Catriona Le May Doan	Speed skating	1	Gold and bronze medallist at 1998 Winter Olympics, leader in the World Cup at both 500 and 1000 metres
1999	Nancy Greene; Athlete of the century^{[c]}	Skiing	—	Olympic gold medallist, two-time Alpine World Cup champion, six-time Canadian champion
2000	Lorie Kane	Golf	2	Winner of three LPGA Tour events
2001	Catriona Le May Doan	Speed skating	2	Canadian and world champion, set world record at 500 metres
2002	Catriona Le May Doan^{[b]}	Speed skating	3	Gold medallist at 2002 Winter Olympics, world champion, overall champion and set Olympic record at 500 metres
2003	Perdita Felicien	Track and field	1	World champion in the 100 metres hurdles.
2004	Lori-Ann Muenzer	Cycling	1	Gold medallist at the 2004 Summer Olympics.
2005	Cindy Klassen	Speed skating	1	Set four world records en route to winning eight medals on World Cup circuit.
2006	Cindy Klassen^{[b]}	Speed skating	2	Won five medals (one gold, two silver, two bronze – Canadian record) at the 2006 Winter Olympics.
2007	Hayley Wickenheiser	Ice hockey	1	Captained Team Canada to world championship gold and named the most valuable player of the tournament.
2008	Chantal Petitclerc^{[b]}	Wheelchair racing	1	Won five gold medals and set three world records at 2008 Summer Paralympics.
2009	Aleksandra Wozniak	Tennis	1	First Canadian in ten years to reach the fourth round of a Grand Slam event.
2010	Joannie Rochette	Figure skating	1	Won the bronze medal at the 2010 Winter Olympics days after her mother died of a heart attack.
2011	Jennifer Heil	Freestyle skiing	1	Finished her career by winning two gold medals in women's moguls at the Freestyle Skiing World Championships.
2012	Christine Sinclair^{[b]}	Soccer	1	Led Team Canada to a bronze medal at the 2012 Summer Olympics, winning the Golden Boot as the tournament's top scorer.
2013	Eugenie Bouchard	Tennis	1	Climbed to number 32 in the WTA rankings, was named Newcomer of the Year.
2014	Eugenie Bouchard	Tennis	2	Reached number 5 in the WTA rankings, was named Most Improved Player, reached Wimbledon Finals.
2015	Brooke Henderson	Golf	1	First Canadian to win on the LPGA Tour in more than a decade.
2016	Penny Oleksiak^{[b]}	Swimming	1	Won four medals (including one gold) at the 2016 Summer Olympics in swimming
2017	Brooke Henderson	Golf	2	Won two LPGA Tour events, finishing 6th on the money list.
2018	Brooke Henderson	Golf	3	Won two LPGA Tour events, first Canadian winner of the Canadian Women's Open title in 45 years, 4th on the money list.
2019	Bianca Andreescu^{[b]}	Tennis	1	Became the first Canadian to win a Grand Slam singles title by capturing the US Open women's singles championship
2020	Christine Sinclair	Soccer	2	Became the all-time leading goal scorer in international play.
2021	Leylah Fernandez	Tennis	1	Winner of the 2021 Monterrey Open and finalist at the 2021 US Open.
2022	Marie-Philip Poulin^{[b]}	Ice hockey	1	Captained Team Canada to gold medals at the 2022 Winter Olympics and 2022 World Championship, scoring her third Olympic game-winning goal at the former.
2023	Summer McIntosh	Swimming	1	Won two gold medals at the 2023 World Aquatics Championships and set two world records.
2024	Summer McIntosh^{[b]}	Swimming	2	Won four medals (three of them gold) at the 2024 Summer Olympics, and five medals (three of them gold) at the 2024 World Aquatics Swimming Championships.
2025	Summer McIntosh	Swimming	3	Won four gold medals at the 2025 World Aquatics Championships, and set three world records.

== Notes ==
^{a} According to the Canadian Press, the award was discontinued between 1942 and 1945 because "sports writers decided athletes cannot rate as heroes while young Canadian pilots, paratroopers and corvette gunners fought for freedom in the shadow of death".

^{b} Denotes athlete also won the Northern Star Award as Canadian athlete of the year

^{c} No winner was announced for the years 1950 or 1999 as the Canadian Press instead voted for athlete of the half-century and century, respectively.

^{d} Joint winners named in 1971
