= Velma Springstead Trophy =

Award for top Canadian female athlete

The Velma Springstead Trophy is an award presented annually to Canada's outstanding female athlete. It is named in honour of track athlete Velma Springstead whose career ended prematurely when she died from pneumonia in 1927 when only 20 years old. The Women's Amateur Athletic Federation (WAAF) of Canada founded this award in 1934. The trophy, also known as the "Rose Bowl," was donated by Alexandrine Gibb, sportswriter with the Toronto Star. The trophy was to be awarded on the basis of "performance, sportsmanship and behaviour." The award is now managed by the True Sport Foundation.

== Past recipients ==
- 2012 - Rosie MacLennan, trampoline
- 2011 – Christine Nesbitt, speed skating
- 2010 – Christine Nesbitt, speed skating
- 2009 – Christine Nesbitt, speed skating
- 2008 – Chantal Petitclerc, Athletics
- 2007 – Kalyna Roberge, speed skating
- 2006 – Cindy Klassen, speed skating
- 2005 – Cindy Klassen, speed skating
- 2004 – Chantal Petitclerc, wheelchair athletics
- 2003 – Perdita Felicien, track and field
- 2002 – Catriona Le May Doan, speed skating
- 2001 – Catriona Le May Doan, speed skating
- 2000 – Caroline Brunet, canoeing
- 1999 – Caroline Brunet, canoeing
- 1998 – Catriona Le May Doan, speed skating
- 1997 – Caroline Brunet, canoeing
- 1996 – Alison Sydor, cycling
- 1995 – Alison Sydor, cycling
- 1994 – Myriam Bédard, biathlon
- 1993 – Kate Pace, alpine skiing
- 1992 – Kerrin Lee-Gartner, alpine skiing
- 1991 – Silken Laumann, rowing
- 1990 – Sylvie Daigle, speed skating
- 1989 – Heather Houston, curling
- 1988 – Carolyn Waldo, synchronized swimming
- 1987 – Carolyn Waldo, synchronized swimming
- 1986 – Carolyn Waldo, synchronized swimming
- 1985 – Carolyn Waldo, synchronized swimming
- 1984 – Linda Thom, shooting
- 1983 – Lynn Chronobrywy, modern pentathlon
- 1982 – Angella Taylor-Issajenko, track and field
- 1981 – Susan Nattrass, shooting
- 1980 – Angella Taylor-Issajenko, track and field
- 1979 – Helen Vanderberg, synchronized swimming
- 1978 – Diane Jones-Konihowski, track and field & Cathy Sherk, golfing
- 1977 – Sylvia Burka, cycling & Susan Nattrass, shooting
- 1976 – Cheryl Gibson, swimming
- 1975 – Nancy Garapick, swimming & Diane Jones, track and field
- 1974 – Wendy Cook, swimming
- 1973 – Karen Magnussen, figure skating
- 1972 – Karen Magnussen, figure skating
- 1971 – Karen Magnussen, figure skating
- 1970 –
- 1969 – Linda Crutchfield-Bocock, luge
- 1968 –
- 1967 –
- 1966 – Elaine Tanner, swimming
- 1965 – Petra Burka, figure skating
- 1964 – Gail Daley, artistic gymnastics
- 1963 – Nancy McCredie, track and field
- 1962 – Mary Stewart, swimming
- 1961 – Mary Stewart, swimming
- 1960 – Anne Heggtveit, skiing
- 1959 – Anne Heggtveit, skiing
- 1958 – Lucille Wheeler, skiing
- 1957 – Marlene Streit, golfing
- 1956 – Marlene Streit, golfing
- 1955 –
- 1954 – Ernestine Russell - gymnastics
- 1953 – Marlene Streit, golfing
- 1952 – Marlene Streit, golfing
- 1951 –
- 1950 – Rosella Thorne, track and field (sprinter)
- 1949 – Eleanor McKenzie, track and field (sprinter)
- 1948 – Viola Myers, track and field
- 1947 – Barbara Ann Scott, figure skating
- 1946 – Irene Strong, swimming
- 1945 – Barbara Ann Scott, figure skating
- 1944 – Rhona Wurtele and Rhoda Wurtele, skiing
- 1943 – Joan Langdon, swimming
- 1942 – Joan Langdon, swimming
- 1941 – Mary Rose Thacker, figure skating
- 1940 – Dorothy Walton, badminton
- 1939 – Jeanette Dolson, track and field
- 1938 – Noel MacDonald, basketball
- 1937 – Robina Higgins, track and field
- 1936 – Betty Taylor, track and field
- 1935 – Aileen Meagher, track and field
- 1934 – Phyllis Dewar, swimming

== See also ==
- Bobbie Rosenfeld Award
- Lionel Conacher Award
- Lou Marsh Trophy
- Athlete of the Year
