= Alexandrine Gibb =

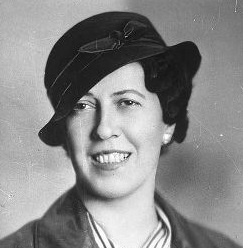
- Gibb in 1934
- Born: 1891; Toronto, Ontario
- Died: December 15, 1958 (aged 66)
- Occupations: Journalist and sports manager
- Known for: inspiring women's sport in Canada

Alexandrine Gibb (1891 – December 15, 1958) was a Canadian athlete and journalist, and a pioneer in women's sports. She created and managed the first international women's team. Gibb advocated for women's branches of sports across Canada and was involved in many women's organizations including the Canadian Ladies' Athletic Club which she inspired. She was a sports journalist for the Toronto Daily Star, where she wrote a daily column entitled "No Man's Land of Sport" and worked for over thirty years.

== Biography ==
Alexandrine Gibb was born in Toronto, Ontario to Sarah and John Gibb in 1891. Her mother, Sarah Sparks, was the daughter of an early Great Lakes captains, Captain James Sparks. John Gibb, her father, owned a dairy. Both were active members in the Queen East Presbyterian Church in Toronto. They married in 1879, and had six children: Alex was the fourth.

She grew up in Toronto and attended Morse Street School. Following this, she went to Havergal College, a private girls' school in Toronto, at the time the most athletically advanced female private school in Ontario. In 1913, she graduated from Havergal at the age of 22.

After graduation, she was a secretary for the Gibson Brothers. During World War I and the expansion of the industrial economy, she continued her career as a secretary in a Toronto mining broker's office. She was set to marry Lieutenant Harry Dibble, a Canadian infantryman; however, he was killed during World War I.

== Athletic career ==
Gibb was an active member in many Toronto sports clubs, where she played tennis, basketball, softball, and track and field. In the winter months of the 1920s, she played as left guard for a basketball team called the Toronto Ladies' Maple Leafs. They were Eastern Canadian champions from 1922 to 1924. Gibb was an asset to the team, with whom she played until 1925. She was also a member of the Cedar Brook Golf Club, where she played tennis and was on the ladies' executive committee.

== Athletic advocacy ==
She began to vocalize her opinion about women's sports in the early 1920s. She lobbied to ensure women would have the same recreational opportunities and equal access to sports facilities that men already had. Other women also pioneered for women's sports during this time but it was Gibb who "gave them ideas and inspiration and quickly became their most articulate spokesperson."

=== Sports administration ===
Gibb was involved in sports administration with many different organizations. She had an important role in establishing many of these organizations, such as the Ladies' Ontario Basketball Association (LOBA). The LOBA was established in 1919 in Toronto and Gibb was elected president in 1925. Alexandrine was also a member of the Toronto Ladies' Athletic Club and in 1920 she was elected president. It was through this club that the phrase "girls' sport run by girls" was coined by Gibb and put into practice. A few years later, Gibb was elected vice president of the Canadian Amateur Basketball Association in 1922, where she was the only female on the executive council.

=== Canadian Ladies' Athletic Club ===
In 1925, the Amateur Athletic Union of Canada (AAUC) asked Gibb to hold tryouts for the Canadian women's track and field team, who were to compete in England that summer. The AAUC picked her because she was a well-known advocate for women's sports and a clever organizer. After seeing the British AAU, Gibb and her team were determined to create a national women's sport organization with branches in all provinces. The Canadian Ladies' Athletic Club was established as a result and Gibb was the first president of this club. Gibb explained in her daily column, "No Man's Land of Sport", that this was "visioned by the Canadian girls' team of 1925 on returning from England."

=== Women's amateur athletics in Canada ===
In September 1925, the Women's Amateur Athletic Union of Canada was created when the AAUC approved a women's branch. Gibb was chosen to draft a constitution for the newly established union with other committee members such as Janet Allen and Marie Parks.

On December 7, 1926, the Women's Amateur Athletic Federation of Canada (WAAFC) was created, which Gibb was a driving force behind. In November 1928, Gibb was elected president of the WAAFC for two years. She was brought back as president in 1931, but when asked to remain president for another year in 1932, she declined the offer. A few years later, Ann Clark announced that Gibb, along with Bobbie Rosenfeld, were no longer welcome in the WAAFC. The reasons behind this were not mentioned.

=== Women's Olympic Team and the Ontario Athletic Commission ===
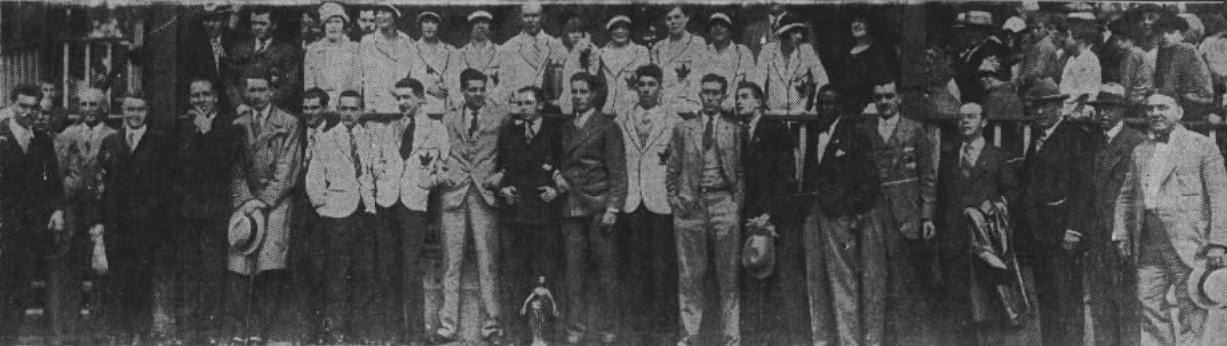
1928 Canadian Olympic team

Gibb continued to advocate for women's sports as she was elected manager of the Canadian women's Olympic team in 1928. This team was named the "matchless six", with six female athletes, such as Ethel Catherwood and Bobbie Rosenfeld. Alex Gibb was chosen as manager because "Miss Gibb has been an outstanding figure in girls' sports for some years and was manager of the Canadian ladies' team in 1925." In addition, she was appointed to the Ontario Athletic Commission (OAC) in September 1934. This made history, as she was "the first commissioner, or 'Duchess', to be named in Canada."

Velma Springstead was a high jumper that Gibb had discovered during her trials in 1925. Springstead had jumped four feet seven inches which was higher than the record held by Innes Bramley. In 1927 Springstead died suddenly of pneumonia. The WAAFC and Gibb personally created the Velma Springstead Trophy in 1932 which was to be awarded the best female Canadian athlete.

== Journalism ==
Gib also lobbied for equality in sports through her journalism career, which began in 1925 with an article about her trip to England with the Canadian Ladies' team. She worked for the Toronto Daily Star, where she published columns about sports and women's sports organizations. Ann Hall discussed Gibb's determination, diligence, and assertiveness, as she was persistent in getting her story. During the late 1920s, there was a lack of female journalists, and Gibb "set the example for the others to follow, becoming what later commentators called the 'dean of women sportswriters.'" E

=== "No Man's Land of Sport" ===
In May 1928, Gibb moved from an occasional reporter to the author of a daily women's sports column. Her column, "No Man's Land of Sport," began being published in May 1928 and ran until November 1940. She targeted a female audience, dispensing information and promoted women's sports. she discussed the inequality in access to sports facilities as she states, "'from bantams to seniors, the boys get the preference in rinks throughout the province.'" In 1934, Gibb was the assistant sports editor at the Toronto Daily Star and "the most well known women's sports advocate in Canada."

=== Work overseas ===
During the summer of 1935, Gibb took a break from writing her column. She traveled to Russia and Asia to write a special series, which was first published on September 9, 1935. The daily articles focused on family relationships, women's roles in society, and life in Russia. Examples of articles from this series are "Trade Mothers' Milk For Cows in Soviet to Help Weak Babies" and "Toll of Famine Years is Stamped on Faces of Russians Over 25," which were both featured on the front page of the Toronto Daily Star in 1935.

=== Other journalism in the Toronto Daily Star ===
Difficulties in writing "No Man's Land of Sport" began in 1936 when her sports editor, Lou Marsh, died. She no longer had sufficient support to continue writing her daily column. Her nemesis, Andy Lytle, had requested that Alex stop writing her daily column prior to him becoming sports editor. The news that she would no longer be writing "No Man's Land of Sport" came on November 26, 1940. After many journalists attempted to write the column, it was last published in 1944.

Alex's presence as a female journalist was still felt during the mid-twentieth century as she covered many stories. She wrote articles on women's work during World War II and was part of the press corps that accompanied Princess Elizabeth Duchess of Edinburgh, and Prince Philip, Duke of Edinburgh, on their Canadian tour.;

A few years later in 1954, Gibb persuaded Marilyn Bell to challenge an American swimmer, Florence Chadwick, to swim across Lake Ontario. In an article, Bell specifically thanked the Star reporter: "I particularly want to thank Alexandrine Gibb. Every time I got scared thinking about the size of this effort, Alex kept me in there and told us what a world-shattering event it would be." As Gibb's role continuously changed, she wrote another daily column in 1956 entitled "Have You Heard," that included news and gossip of local interest. This was the last column she wrote for the Toronto Daily Star.

== Death ==
Alexandrine Gibb died on December 15, 1958, of a heart attack at the age of 66. On December 16, an article was written in the Toronto Daily Star that stated, "Alexandrine Gibb was first and foremost a real newspaper woman." She was buried in St. James Cemetery in Toronto alongside 18 other members of her family. After her death, she was inducted in the Canada's Sports Hall of Fame in 2015.

== Bibliography ==
- Adams, Carly. "Organizing Hockey for Women" In Coast to Coast: Hockey in Canada to the Second World War, edited by John Chi-Kit Wong, 132-159. Toronto: University of Toronto Press, 2009.
- "Alex Gibb." The Toronto Daily Star, December 16, 1958.
- "Canadian Ladies' Athletic Club Relay Team." The Toronto Daily Star, August 14, 1926.
- Gibb, Alexandrine. "No Man's Land of Sport." The Toronto Daily Star, May 25, 1928.
- Gibb, Alexandrine. "Toll of Famine Years is Stamped on Faces of Russians Over 25." The Toronto Daily Star, September 13, 1935.
- Gibb, Alexandrine. "Trade Mothers' Milk For Cows in Soviet to Help Weak Babies." The Toronto Daily Star, September 9, 1935.
- "Greatest Staff to Cover Royal Tour for Star." The Toronto Daily Star, October 6, 1951.
- Hall, M. Ann. "Alexandrine Gibb: In 'No Man's Land of Sport'" In Freeing the Female Body: Inspirational Icons, edited by Fan Hong and J. A. Mangan, 149- 172. Portland: Frank Cass Publishers, 2001.
- "In Charge of Canadian Ladies' Olympic Team." The Toronto Daily Star, May 5, 1928.
- Kidd, Bruce. "Girls' Sports Run By Girls" In The Struggle for Canadian Sport, 94-145. Toronto: University of Toronto Press, 1996.
- "Ontario's New Dukes and 'The Duchess.'" The Toronto Daily Star, September 13, 1934.
- "Thanks for Star Backing Voiced by Marilyn, Ryder." The Toronto Daily Star, September 16, 1954.
- "Top News, Sports Reporter For the Star, Alexandrine Gibb Dies." The Toronto Daily Star, December 16, 1958.
