= Stacey West =

Stacey West may refer to:

- Stacey West, character in Gavin & Stacey
- Stacey West (golfer) in Canadian Women's Amateur
- Stacey-West Stand at Sincil Bank
