= Lynn Séguin =

Canadian modern pentathlete

Personal information
- Born: 1962 (age 63–64)
- Spouse: Claude Séguin

Sport
- Country: Canada
- Sport: Modern pentathlon
Medal record
Modern Pentathlon
Representing Canada
World Modern Pentathlon Championships
Gold medal – first place	1983 Gothenburg	Individual

Lynn Séguin (née Chronobrywy born 1962 or 1963) is a former modern pentathlon athlete. She won the Velma Springstead Trophy for Canada's best female athlete in 1983.

== Early life and education ==
Chronobrywy graduated from Douglas College in coaching and certified as a national coach by the National Coaching Institute in Saskatchewan. She is also a designated master of arms by the Fencing Academy of Canada.

== Career ==
From 1980 to 1983, Chronobrywy competed at the World Modern Pentathlon Championships with a gold medal in 1983. Chronobrywy won a total of 7 national pentathlon championships in her athletic career.

Following her career in modern pentathlon, Chronobrywy became a fencing coach in British Columbia. She opened clubs for fencing in Maple Ridge and Aldergrove and co-led the British Columbia fencing team in the 1999 Canada Games. While in British Columbia, Chronobrywy was asked to lead a Canadian women's fencing team. However, upon given a coaching opportunity by Claude Séguin after completing her training, she moved to Saskatoon in 2001. Once in Saskatchewan, she taught at multiple fencing clubs and coached for Saskatchewan at the Canada Games since 2007.

== Awards and honours ==
In 1983, she won the Velma Springstead Trophy as the best Canadian female athlete of the year. In 2016, Chronobrywy was awarded the Female Coach Dedication Award at the Saskatchewan Sport Awards.

== Personal life ==
In 2002, Chronobrywy married Claude Séguin. In Saskatoon, she and her husband run Salle Séguin, a training ground for fencing clubs of Saskatchewan.
