= Cathy Sherk =

Canadian golfer, coach, and instructor

Personal information
- Full name: Cathy Sherk
- Nationality: Canada
- Born: June 17, 1950 (age 76) Bancroft, Ontario, Canada
- Height: 5 ft 8 in (1.73 m)

Career
- Sport: Golf
- Turned professional: 1979
- Former tour: LPGA Tour
- Professional wins: 3

Best results in LPGA major championships
- Chevron Championship: T48: 1983
- Women's PGA C'ship: T30: 1979
- U.S. Women's Open: T16: 1981
- du Maurier Classic: T16: 1979

Achievements and awards
- Canadian Golf Hall of Fame: 1995

Cathy Sherk (née Graham, born June 17, 1950) is a Canadian golf champion and professional golf coach and instructor.

== Early life and amateur career ==
Sherk was born in Bancroft, Ontario on 17 June 1950.

She was taught golf by Gordon McInnis.

In 1977, Sherk won the Canadian Women's Amateur and was runner-up to Beth Daniel at the U.S. Women's Amateur. The following year her performances earned her the 1978 No.1 World Amateur ranking by Golf Digest and she was named co-winner of the Velma Springstead Trophy as her country's outstanding female athlete. That year she successfully defended her Canadian championship and won the U.S. Women's Amateur, the North and South Women's Amateur and earned silver medal honors as a member of the Canadian team at the 1978 Espirito Santo Trophy.

She was named as the Ontario Athlete of the Year in 1978.

== Professional career ==
In 1979, Sherk turned professional. She joined the LPGA Tour where she finished the season in third place for Rookie-of-the-Year honors behind Beth Daniel. Sherk continued playing on the LPGA on a limited basis until 1983; her best finish was at the 1981 American/Defender WRAL Classic when she finished runner-up to Donna Caponi.

In Canada, she was the 1986, 1987 and 1990 Women's CPGA champion. Active as a teacher of young golfers, she ran the Ontario Junior Girls Golf Camp and was National Coach of the Canadian Ladies Golf Association from 1995 to 1999.

== Personal life ==
Sherk is married to Ric Sherk. They have a son, Chris.

== Awards and honors ==
In 1995, she was inducted into the Canadian Golf Hall of Fame.

== Amateur wins ==
- 1976 Ontario Women's Amateur
- 1977 Canadian Women's Amateur
- 1978 U.S. Women's Amateur, North and South Women's Amateur, Canadian Women's Amateur, Ontario Women's Amateur

== Professional wins (3) ==
- 1988 Canadian PGA Women's Championship
- 1990 Canadian PGA Women's Championship
- 1991 Canadian PGA Women's Championship

== Team appearances ==
Amateur

- Espirito Santo Trophy (representing Canada): 1978
