= Mary Ann Hayward =

Personal information
- Nationality: Canada
- Born: March 10, 1960 (age 66) Lachine, Quebec, Canada

Career
- Sport: Golf
- College: Florida International College
- Status: Amateur

Best results in LPGA major championships
- du Maurier Classic: T33: 1995

Mary Ann Hayward (nee Lapointe; born March 10, 1960) is a Canadian amateur golfer. She holds the Ontario record for most wins in a provincial championship. At the international level, Hayward won the United States Mid-Amateur Championship, becoming the only Canadian with this title. Hayward is a member of the Canadian Golf Hall of Fame, Ontario Golf Hall of Fame, and Quebec Golf Hall of Fame.

== Early life ==
Hayward was born on March 10, 1960, in Lachine, Quebec, Canada. She started playing golf at age 10 but it was only in 1979, when she placed second at the Quebec amateur championship, that she chose to pursue the sport as a career. The following year, she accepted a golf scholarship to Florida International College where she tied with Julie Inkster, Val Skinner and Jody Rosenthal for second place at the National Collegiate Athletic Association golf championships. Upon returning to Canada, she moved to Ontario for the first time in 1984 and lived in Guelph for five years. She played on the professional women's mini-tour but failed to qualify for the LPGA qualifying tour.

== Amateur career ==
While living in Ontario, Hayward was the only Quebec native competing for the 1983 Ontario Women's Amateur Championship and the second Quebec golfer to ever win the title. She was ranked as a professional golfer for two seasons until being reinstated as an amateur in 1986.

In September 1992, Hayward was selected to represent Canada at the world amateur golf championship. However, after a lawsuit from Lorie Kane contesting the choosing process, she was left off the team. However, the morning the event started, another golfer withdrew due to a severe migraine headache, and Hayward was announced as her replacement.

She returned to Quebec in 1989 where she got married and regained her amateur status. As an amateur, she became the first in eight years to play all four rounds of the major championship the 1995 du Maurier Ltd. Classic.

Hayward remained in Quebec for six years, from 1989 to 1995, before returning to Ontario. Prior to her move, she had won five provincial amateur titles and two national amateur championships. In 1997, Hayward recorded 3-under-par 69 at Sorel-Tracy for a 36-hole total of 142, to earn an exemption into the LPGA du Maurier Classic. Two years later, she returned to Quebec temporarily to win the Quebec Ladies Amateur Championship for the sixth time.

In 2005, Hayward became the first golfer born outside the United States to win the United States Mid-Amateur Championship, and just the sixth Canadian to win an event run by the United States Golf Association. Over her amateur career, Hayward won the Women's Provincial Amateur Championship six times and won the Women's Provincial Mid-Amateur Championship in 2005, 2008, and 2010. She also established a provincial record by winning the Mid-Amateur Championship twelve times and being a member of Ontario's Interprovincial Team nine times.

In September 2015, Hayward carded four birdies and four bogeys to become a United States Senior Women's Mid-Am Medalist at the 2015 U.S. Senior Women's Amateur Championship. This marked the second time she had been the stroke-play medalist at a USGA championship. Later that year, Hayward officially announced her retirement from the Golf Association of Ontario. Following her retirement, she competed and won the 2017 Women's North and South Senior Championship.

== Honours ==
Hayward was inducted into the Ontario Golf Hall of Fame in 2006. The following year, she was also inducted into the Canadian Golf Hall of Fame. In 2011, Hayward was inducted into the Quebec Golf Hall of Fame.

== Personal life ==
Hayward and her husband have two daughters together.

== Amateur wins ==
- 1981 Quebec Women’s Amateur
- 1982 Quebec Women’s Amateur
- 1983 Ontario Amateur Championship
- 1990 Ontario Amateur Championship, Quebec Women’s Amateur
- 1991 Quebec Women’s Amateur
- 1993 Canadian Women's Amateur, Quebec Women’s Amateur
- 1995 Ontario Amateur Championship
- 1996 Ontario Amateur Championship, Canadian Women's Amateur
- 1997 Ontario Amateur Championship
- 1999 Canadian Women's Amateur, Quebec Women’s Amateur
- 2004 Canadian Women's Amateur
- 2005 U.S. Women's Mid-Amateur
- 2008 Canadian Women’s Mid-Amateur
- 2010 Canadian Women’s Senior Championship
- 2011 Canadian Women’s Senior Championship
- 2013 Canadian Women’s Senior Championship
- 2023 Canadian Women’s Senior Championship

== Team appearances ==
Amateur

- Espirito Santo Trophy (representing Canada): 1990, 1992, 1994, 1996, 1998, 2000
