= Northern Star Award =

Award for Canada's top athlete

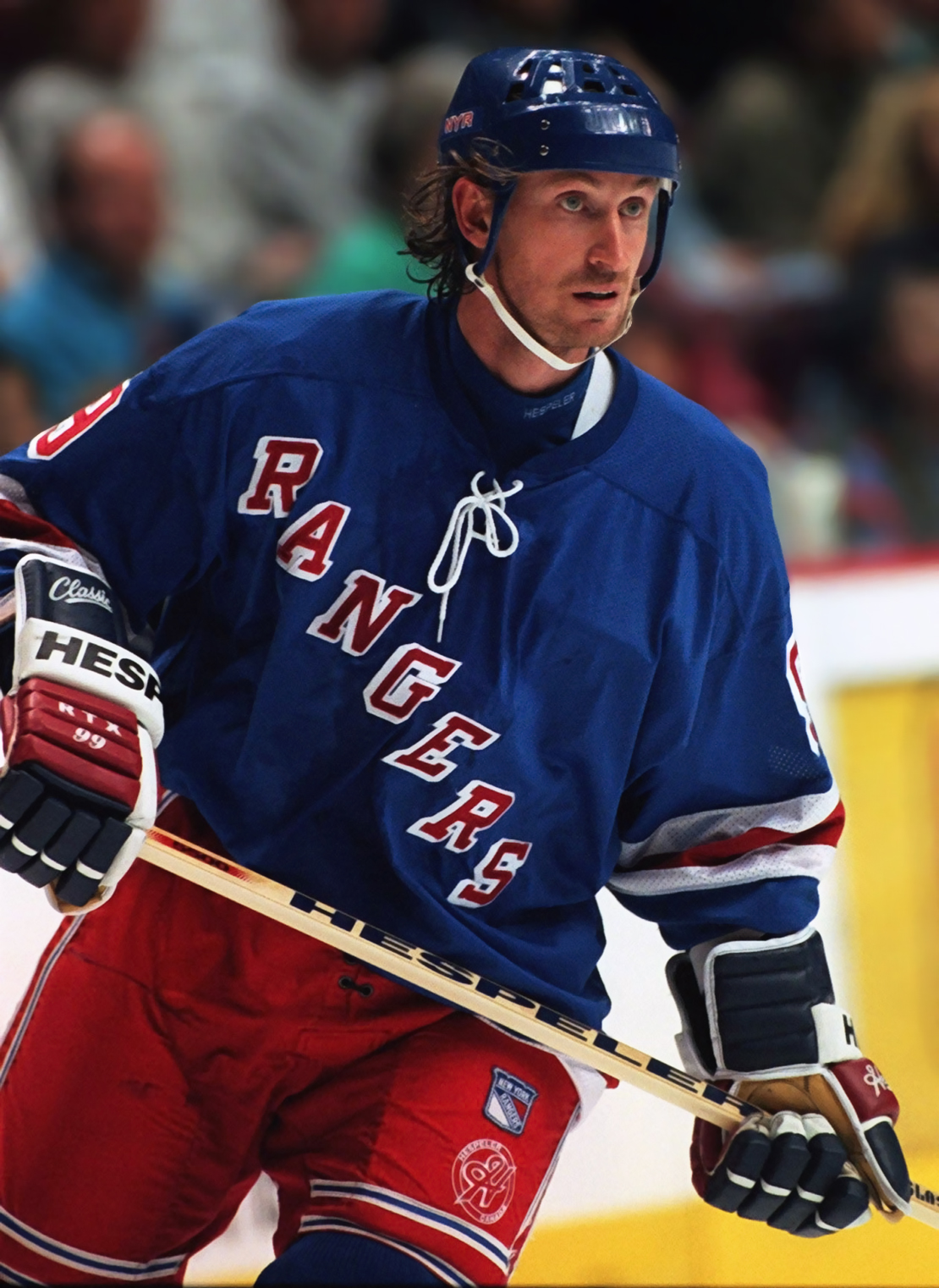
Hockey player Wayne Gretzky has won the Northern Star Award four times, more than any other athlete.

The Northern Star Award, formerly known as the Lou Marsh Trophy, the Lou Marsh Memorial Trophy and Lou Marsh Award, is a trophy awarded annually to Canada's top athlete, professional or amateur. It is awarded by a panel of journalists, with the vote taking place in December. It was first awarded in 1936, named in honour of Lou Marsh, a prominent Canadian athlete, referee, and former sports editor of the Toronto Star. The trophy is made of black marble and stands around 75 centimetres high. The words "With Pick and Shovel" (the name of Marsh's long-running Star column) appear above the engraved names of the winners. The voting panel consists of sports media voters from across the country including representatives from the Toronto Star, The Canadian Press, FAN590, The Globe and Mail, CBC, Rogers Sportsnet, CTV/TSN, La Presse and the National Post.

The award has been awarded 81 times and won by 63 individual athletes and three pairs; in the voting for the 2018 Lou Marsh Trophy, it was decided in the future pairs should not be eligible for the trophy, thereby disqualifying Tessa Virtue / Scott Moir from consideration. Wayne Gretzky won the trophy four times, more than any other athlete, while Barbara Ann Scott won the trophy three times, more than any other woman. It was not awarded from 1942 to 1944 due to World War II.

There were ties between different athletes in 1978 and 2020 with soccer player Alphonso Davies & American football player Laurent Duvernay-Tardif as the most recent co-winners. In 1982, Rick Hansen was the auxiliary award of special merit winner (he won nine gold medals at the Pan-American Wheelchair Games) alongside first-time winner Wayne Gretzky, "who was the unanimous choice of the selection committee".

On November 16, 2022, it was announced the award would be renamed from the Lou Marsh Award to the Northern Star Award "after concerns were raised about racist language used by Marsh, who died in 1936, during his years of sportswriting."

== Winners ==
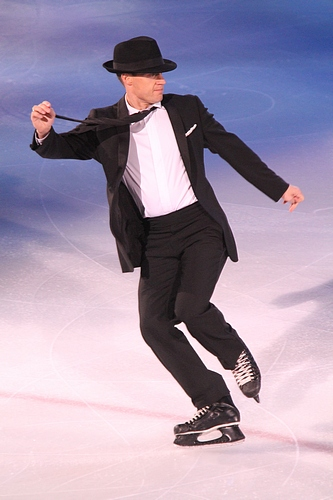
Kurt Browning, 1990 winner

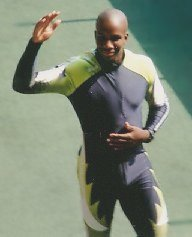
Donovan Bailey, 1996 winner

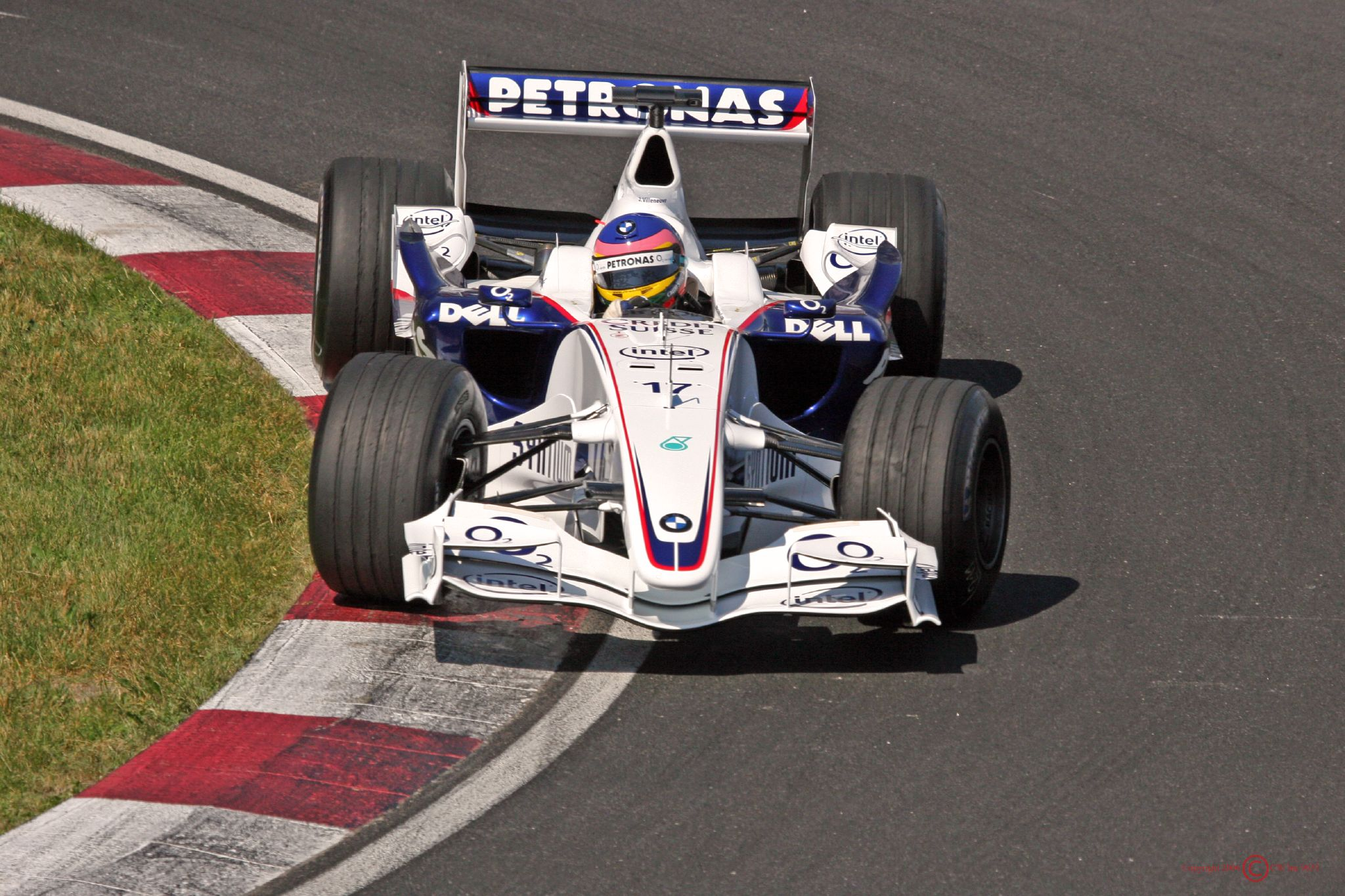
Jacques Villeneuve, 1995 and 1997 winner

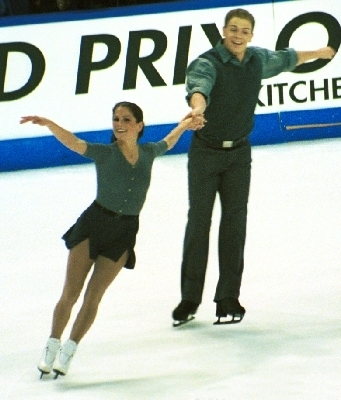
Jamie Salé and David Pelletier, 2001 winners

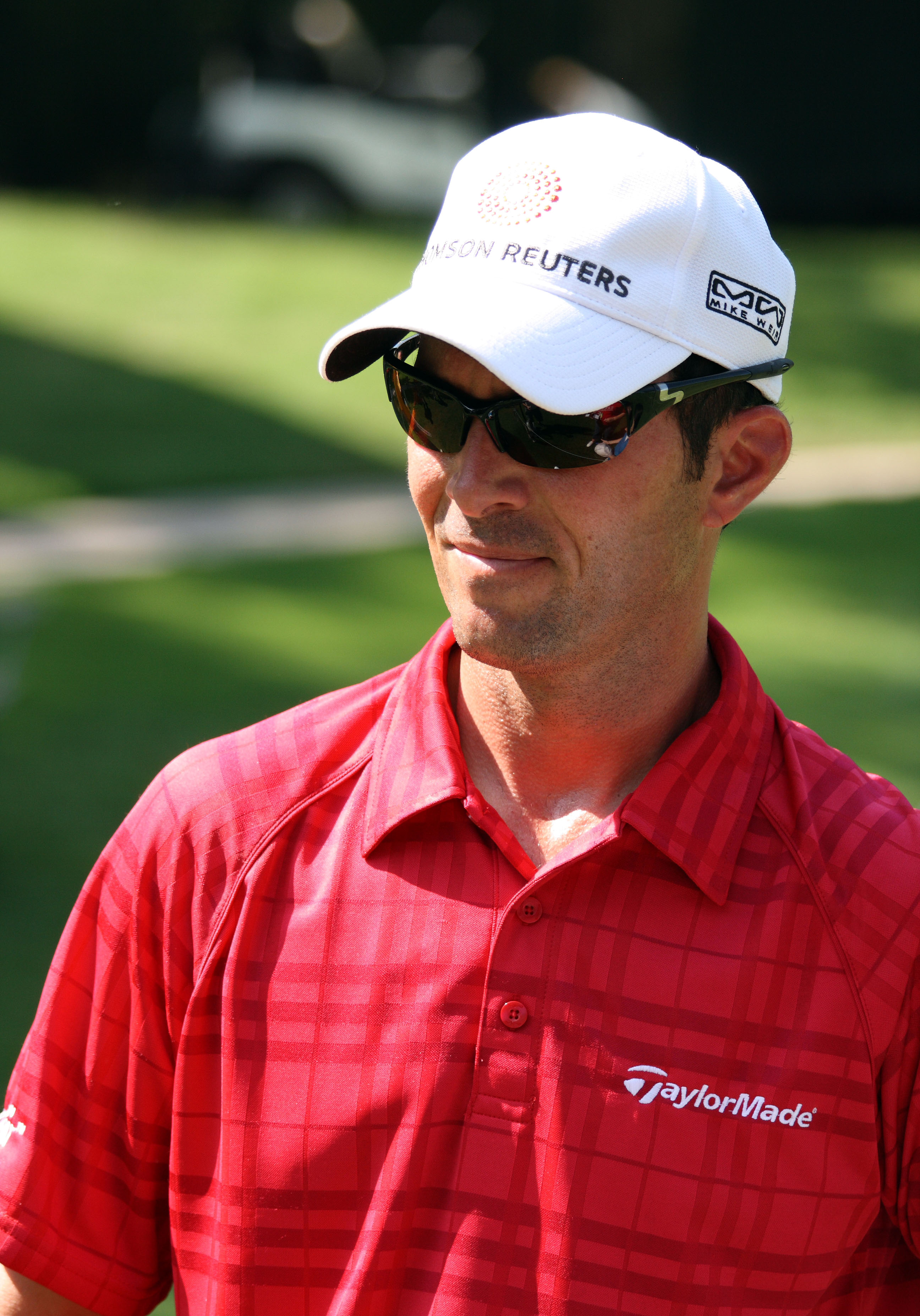
Mike Weir, 2003 winner

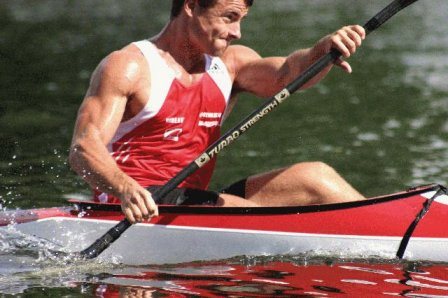
Adam van Koeverden, 2004 winner

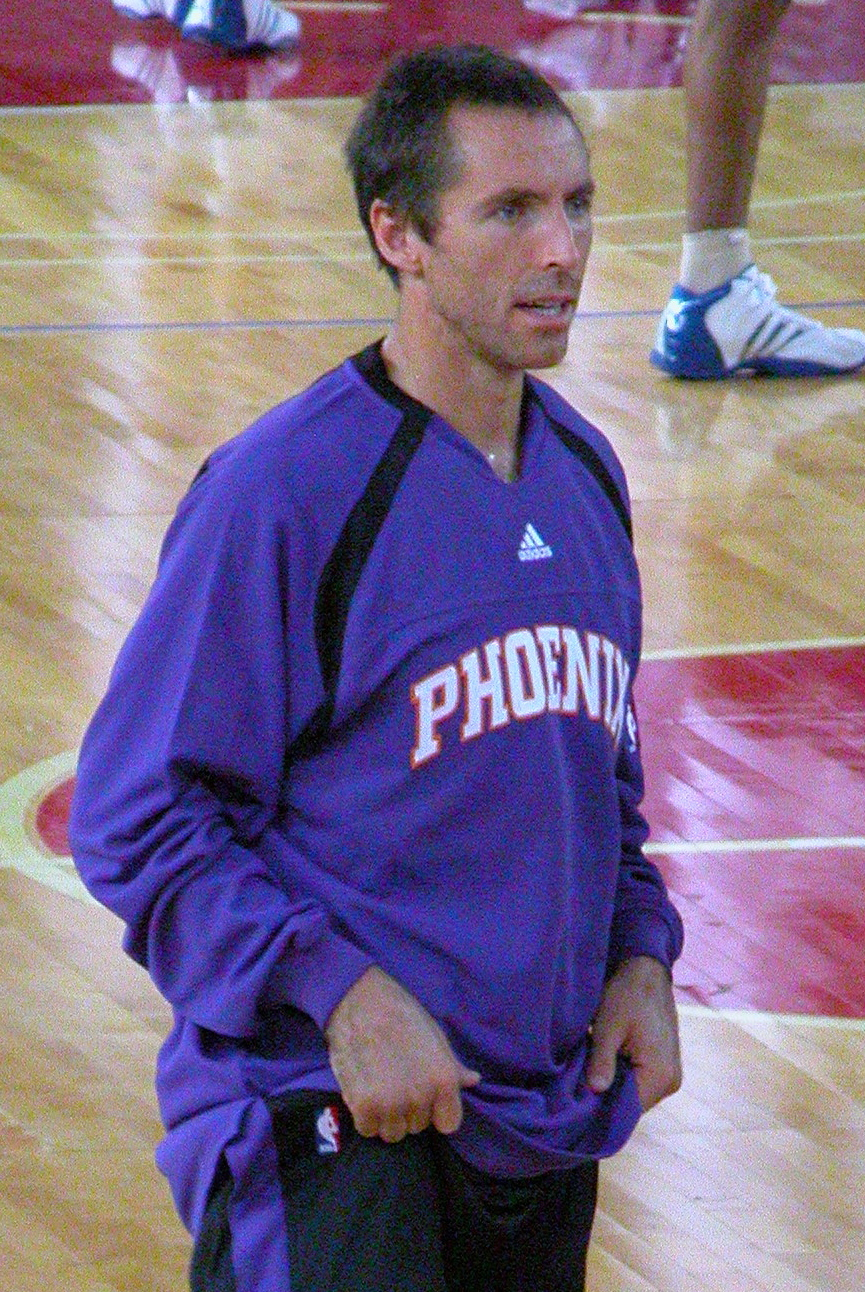
Steve Nash, 2005 winner

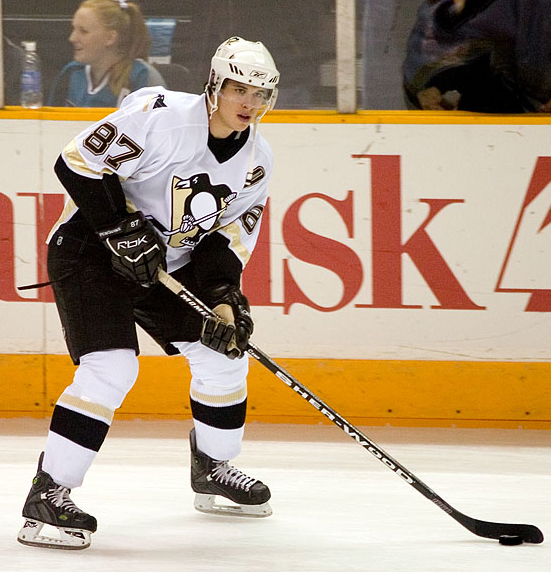
Sidney Crosby, 2007 and 2009 winner

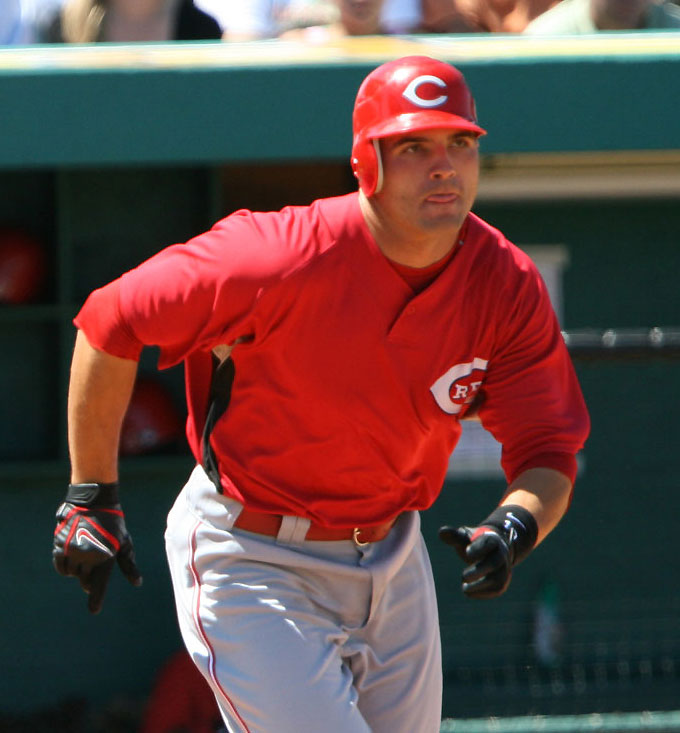
Joey Votto, 2010 and 2017 winner

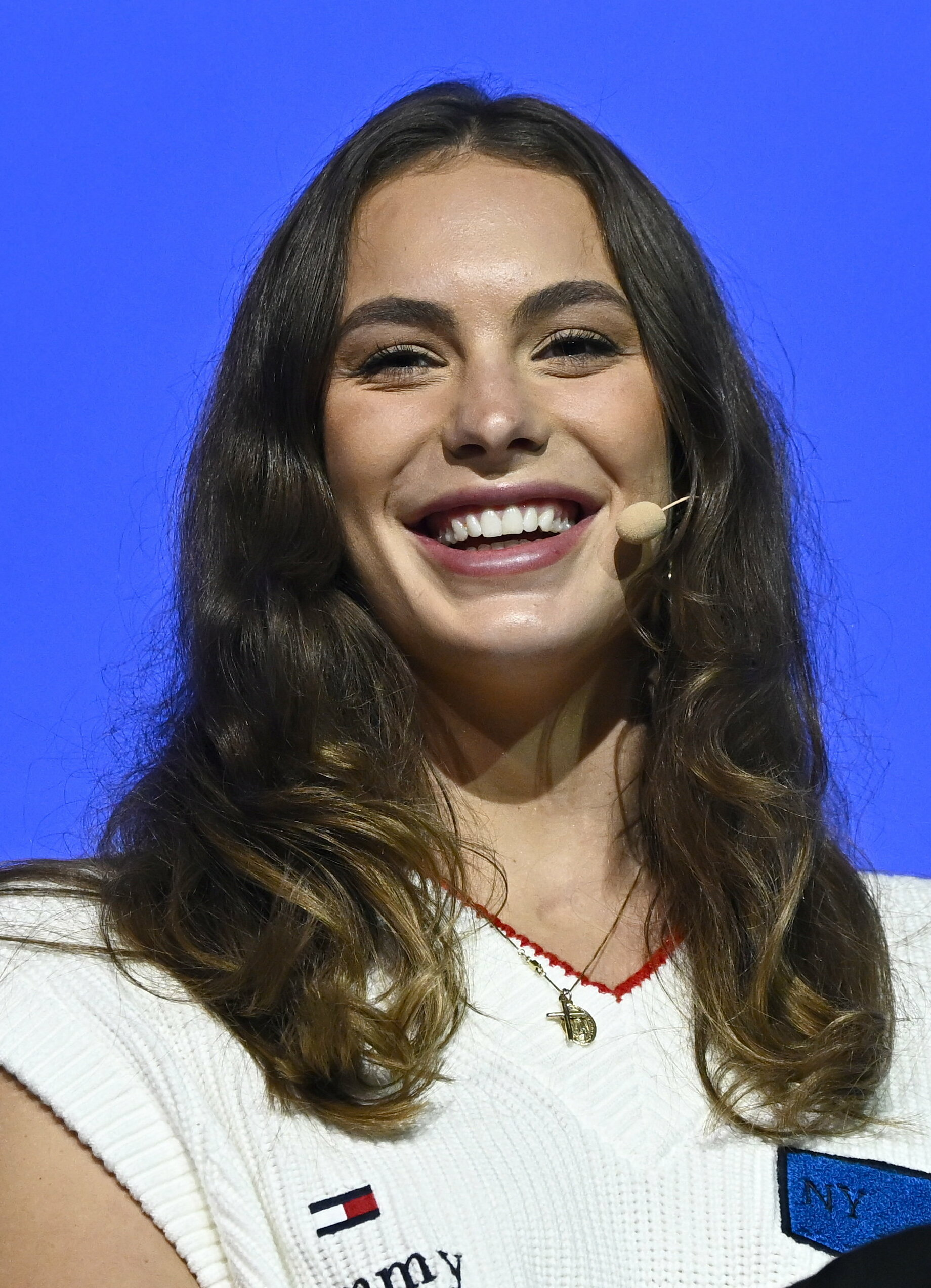
Penny Oleksiak, 2016 winner

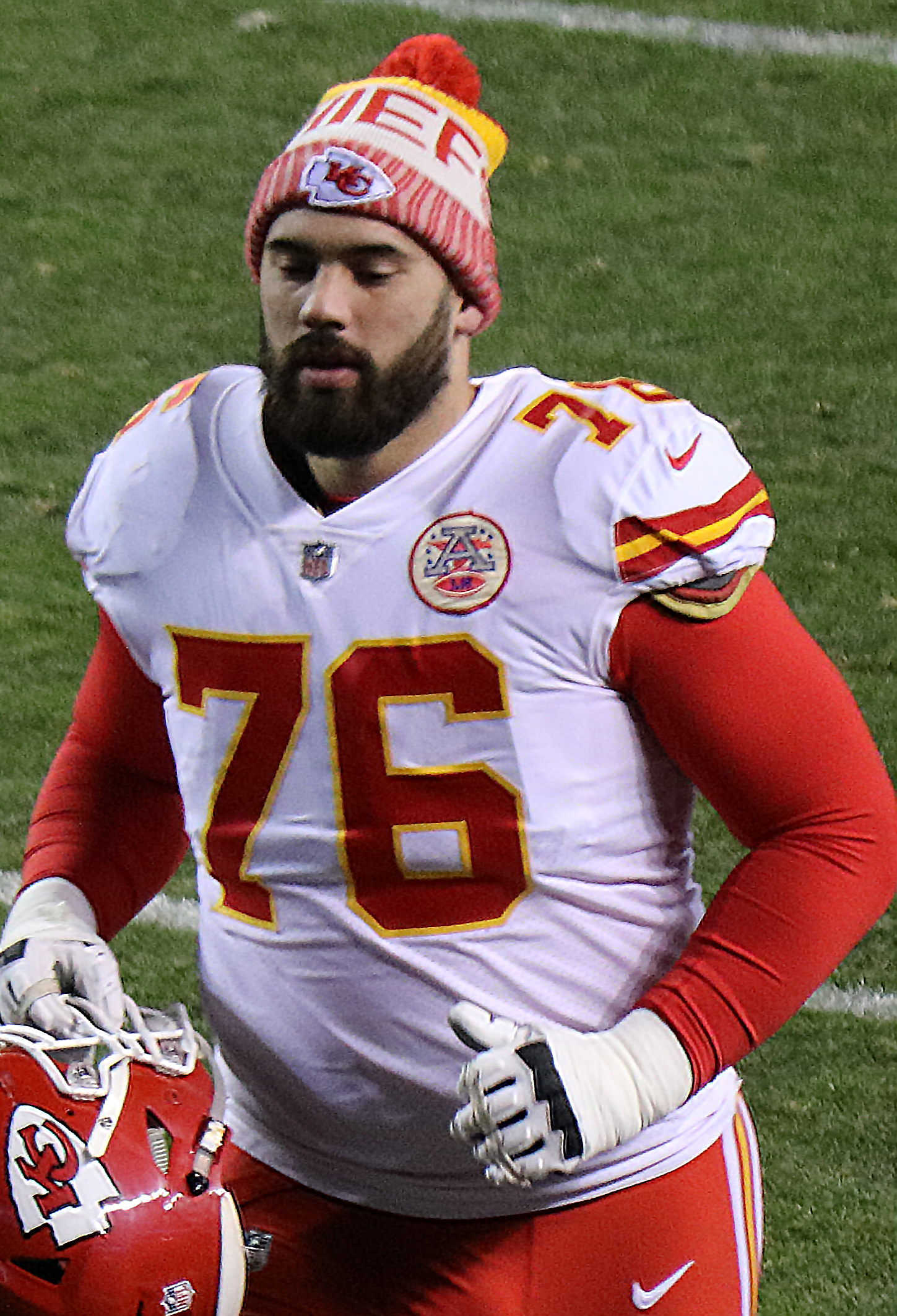
Laurent Duvernay-Tardif, 2020 winner

Key

- * = Also won the Lionel Conacher Award as Canadian male athlete of the year
- ^ = Also won the Bobbie Rosenfeld Award as Canadian female athlete of the year

Winners
Year	Winner	Sport	Win #
1936	Phil Edwards *	Track and field	1
1937	Marshal Cleland	Equestrian	1
1938	Bobby Pearce	Rowing	1
1939	Bob Pirie	Swimming	1
1940	Gérard Côté *	Marathon	1
1941	Theo Dubois	Rowing	1
1942	None		
1943	None		
1944	None		
1945	Barbara Ann Scott	Figure skating	1
1946	Joe Krol *	Canadian football	1
1947	Barbara Ann Scott ^	Figure skating	2
1948	Barbara Ann Scott ^	Figure skating	3
1949	Cliff Lumsdon	Swimming	1
1950	Bob McFarlane	Canadian football & track and field	1
1951	Marlene Streit	Golf	1
1952	George Genereux	Shooting	1
1953	Doug Hepburn *	Weightlifting	1
1954	Marilyn Bell ^	Swimming	1
1955	Beth Whittall	Swimming	1
1956	Marlene Streit ^	Golf	2
1957	Maurice Richard *	Hockey	1
1958	Lucile Wheeler ^	Alpine skiing	1
1959	Barbara Wagner & Bob Paul	Figure skating	1
1960	Anne Heggtveit ^	Alpine skiing	1
1961	Bruce Kidd *	Track and field	1
1962	Donald Jackson	Figure skating	1
1963	Bill Crothers	Track and field	1
1964	Roger Jackson & George Hungerford	Rowing	1
1965	Petra Burka ^	Figure skating	1
1966	Elaine Tanner ^	Swimming	1
1967	Nancy Greene ^	Alpine skiing	1
1968	Nancy Greene ^	Alpine skiing	2
1969	Russ Jackson *	Canadian football	1
1970	Bobby Orr *	Hockey	1
1971	Hervé Filion	Harness racing	1
1972	Phil Esposito *	Hockey	1
1973	Sandy Hawley	Horse racing	1
1974	Ferguson Jenkins *	Baseball	1
1975	Bobby Clarke *	Hockey	1
1976	Sandy Hawley	Horse racing	2
1977	Guy Lafleur *	Hockey	1
1978	Graham Smith	Swimming	1
1978	Ken Read *	Alpine skiing	1
1979	Sandra Post ^	Golf	1
1980	Terry Fox	Marathon of Hope	1
1981	Susan Nattrass	Shooting	1
1982	Wayne Gretzky *	Hockey	1
1982	Rick Hansen	Wheelchair racing	1
1983	Wayne Gretzky *	Hockey	2
1984	Gaétan Boucher	Speed skating	1
1985	Wayne Gretzky *	Hockey	3
1986	Ben Johnson *	Track and field	1
1987	Ben Johnson *	Track and field	2
1988	Carolyn Waldo ^	Synchronized swimming	1
1989	Wayne Gretzky *	Hockey	4
1990	Kurt Browning *	Figure skating	1
1991	Silken Laumann ^	Rowing	1
1992	Mark Tewksbury *	Swimming	1
1993	Mario Lemieux *	Hockey	1
1994	Myriam Bédard ^	Biathlon	1
1995	Jacques Villeneuve *	Auto racing	1
1996	Donovan Bailey *	Track and field	1
1997	Jacques Villeneuve *	Auto racing	2
1998	Larry Walker *	Baseball	1
1999	Caroline Brunet	Kayaking	1
2000	Daniel Igali	Wrestling	1
2001	Jamie Salé & David Pelletier	Figure skating	1
2002	Catriona LeMay Doan ^	Speed skating	1
2003	Mike Weir *	Golf	1
2004	Adam van Koeverden	Kayaking	1
2005	Steve Nash *	Basketball	1
2006	Cindy Klassen ^	Speed skating	1
2007	Sidney Crosby *	Hockey	1
2008	Chantal Petitclerc ^	Wheelchair racing	1
2009	Sidney Crosby *	Hockey	2
2010	Joey Votto	Baseball	1
2011	Patrick Chan *	Figure skating	1
2012	Christine Sinclair ^	Soccer	1
2013	Jon Cornish	Canadian football	1
2014	Kaillie Humphries	Bobsleigh	1
2015	Carey Price *	Hockey	1
2016	Penny Oleksiak ^	Swimming	1
2017	Joey Votto	Baseball	2
2018	Mikaël Kingsbury *	Freestyle skiing	1
2019	Bianca Andreescu ^	Tennis	1
2020	Alphonso Davies *	Soccer	1
2020	Laurent Duvernay-Tardif	American football	1
2021	Damian Warner *	Track and field	1
2022	Marie-Philip Poulin ^	Hockey	1
2023	Shai Gilgeous-Alexander *	Basketball	1
2024	Summer McIntosh ^	Swimming	1
2025	Shai Gilgeous-Alexander	Basketball	2

== Winners by sport ==
Not included in this table are Terry Fox and Laurent Duvernay-Tardif, as their respective wins were based on their social contributions, rather than their participation in a sport in general. Fox was awarded for the Marathon of Hope; Duvernay-Tardif was awarded for opting out of playing in the 2020 NFL season for the Kansas City Chiefs after winning Super Bowl LIV to work as an orderly at a long-term care facility during the COVID-19 pandemic in Quebec.

Winners by sport
Wins	Sport	# of Individuals
14	Ice hockey	10
9	Swimming	9
8	Figure skating	7
8	Track and field	7
6	Alpine skiing	5
4	Gridiron football	4
4	Rowing	4
4	Baseball	3
3	Golf	3
3	Speed skating	3
3	Basketball	2
2	Kayaking	2
2	Shooting	2
2	Soccer	2
2	Wheelchair racing	2
2	Auto racing	1
2	Horse racing	1
1	Biathlon	1
1	Bobsleigh	1
1	Equestrian	1
1	Freestyle skiing	1
1	Harness racing	1
1	Marathon	1
1	Synchronized swimming	1
1	Tennis	1
1	Weightlifting	1
1	Wrestling	1

== See also ==
- List of members of Canada's Sports Hall of Fame
- Canadian Olympic Hall of Fame
- Lionel Conacher Award
- Bobbie Rosenfeld Award
- Canadian Press Team of the Year Award
- Velma Springstead Trophy
- Sports in Canada
- Athlete of the Year
