= Gail Harvey Moore =

Canadian amateur golfer (1943–1993)

Gail Harvey Moore (13 June 1943 – 12 May 1993) was a Canadian amateur golfer. Harvey won the Canadian Junior Girls Championship consecutively from 1958 to 1960. In LPGA major competition, she finished 36th at the 1960 Titleholders Championship. Her Canadian Women's Close Golf Championship victories occurred in 1964 and 1965.

Following her marriage, Moore won the 1970 Canadian Women's Amateur. She was second overall for the Canadian Ladies' Golf Association in 1978. With Canada, they were second at the 1966 Espirito Santo Trophy and won the 1979 Commonwealth Trophy. Moore was elected to the Canadian Golf Hall of Fame in 1998 and the B.C. Sports Hall of Fame in 2004.

== Early life ==
Harvey was born in Toronto on 13 June 1943. During her late childhood, she became a golfer. From 1958 to 1960, Harvey won the Canadian Junior Girls Championship consecutively. She was the 1959 Ontario Ladies Open Championship winner. Her "consecutive Ontario junior girls golf [championships]" were in 1960 and 1961. For her post-secondary education, Harvey went to the University of Toronto and the Ontario College of Education during the 1960s.

== Career ==
=== 1960 to 1965 ===
Harvey was a quarterfinalist at the 1960 North and South Women's Amateur. She was 36th at that year's Titleholders Championship, an LPGA major. Harvey played at the 1962 U.S. Women's Amateur during the first round.

In Canada, she was the 1962 Quebec Ladies Open champion. Her Canadian Women's Close Golf Championship victories occurred in 1964 and 1965. Harvey played in the first round of the 1964 British Ladies Amateur. She was fourth with Canada at that year's Espirito Santo Trophy. In 1965, she was a "physical education teacher at Yorkdale Vocational" as well as continuing to compete as an amateur golfer. She also held this position at the time of her December 1965 wedding.

=== 1966 to 1990s ===
As Gail Harvey Moore, she continued both positions in mid-1966. By late 1966, she lived in Vancouver and continued her golfing career. Moore appeared in LPGA Tour events during the remainder of the 1960s as an amateur golfer. She was runner-up in the 1969 women's title held by the Pacific Northwest Golf Association. During an interview that year, Moore preferred to stay as an amateur golfer instead of moving to professional golf.

Moore experienced bone fractures during an October 1969 car accident. Traction and crutches were used for her bone healing. She resumed her career in early 1970. That year, Moore was the British Columbia Ladies' Close Championship and Canadian Women's Amateur winner.

At the 1966 Espirito Santo Trophy, the Canadian team finished second while Moore finished tied for 10th individually. The Canadian team finished in the top five in both 1968 and 1970. At the Commonwealth Trophy, Moore was on the Canadian team in 1967, 1971, and the winning 1979 team.

By 1975, Moore reduced her golf career and took care of her children. This continued throughout the 1980s. Moore continued her golfing career in the 1990s.

== Overall performance and honours ==
Harvey was in third place for "Canada's outstanding female athlete of 1964 ... [by The] Canadian Press". This reoccurred during the 1965 edition. As a Canadian Ladies' Golf Association player, she was second overall in 1978.

Her inductions include the Canadian Golf Hall of Fame in 1998 and the Ontario Golf Hall of Fame during 2000. Moore became a member of the BC Sports Hall of Fame in 2004. Additional memberships were the Golf Hall of Fame of B.C in 2005 and the Pacific Northwest Golf Association Hall of Fame during 2009.

== Personal life and death ==
Moore had three children during her marriage. Her son James Moore was the Minister of Canadian Heritage and Official Languages and Minister of Industry. She had cancer upon her 12 May 1993 death in Coquitlam.
