= Marilyn Bell =

Canadian long distance swimmer (born 1937)

Marilyn Grace Bell Di Lascio OOnt
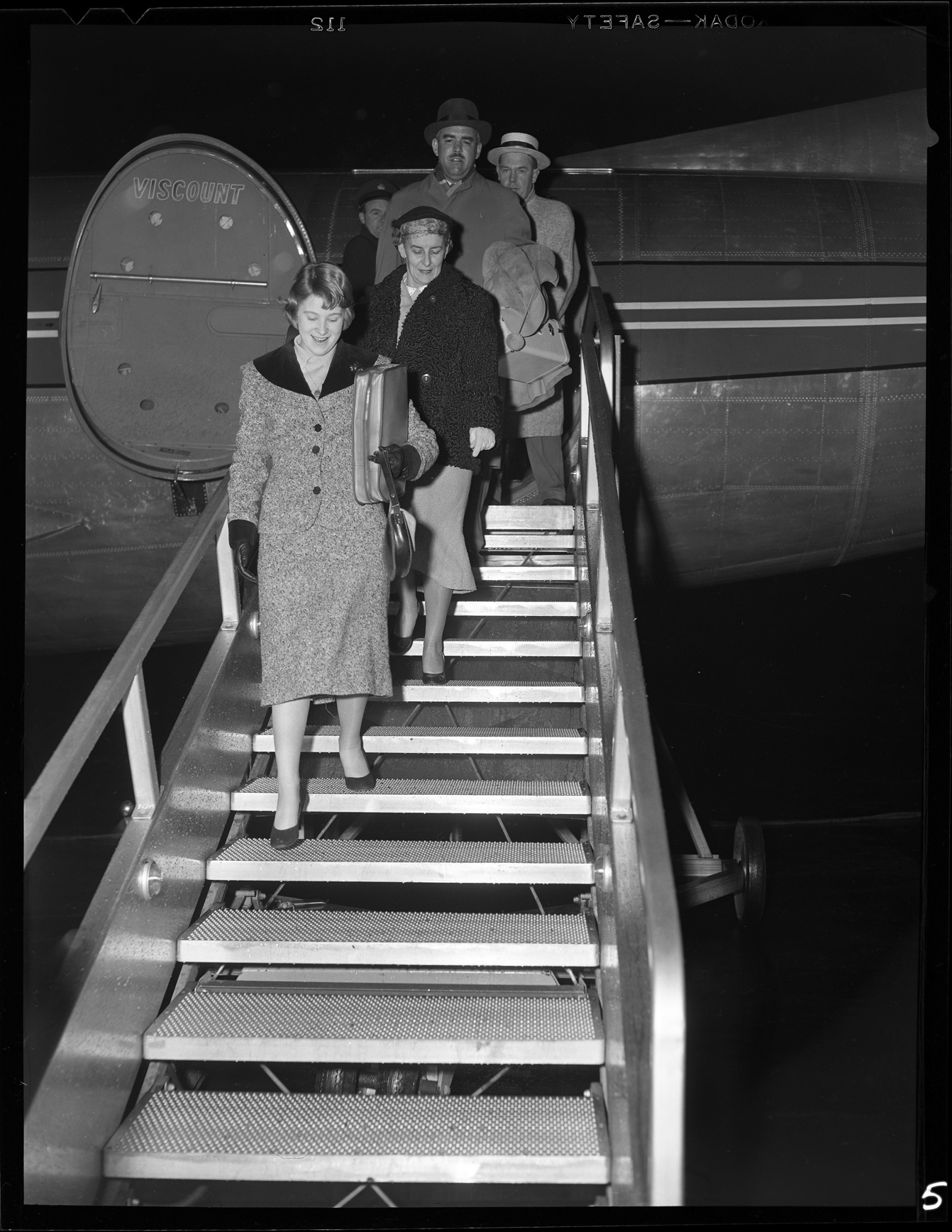
- Bell (foreground) in 1955
- Born: Marilyn Grace Bell; October 19, 1937 (age 89); Toronto, Ontario, Canada
- Known for: Long-distance swimming
- Children: 4

Marilyn Grace Bell Di Lascio (born October 19, 1937) is a Canadian retired long distance swimmer. She was the first person to swim across Lake Ontario and later swam the English Channel and Strait of Juan de Fuca.

== Personal life ==
Bell was born in Toronto, Ontario, to parents Sydney and Grace Bell. The family moved to North Bay, Ontario, then Halifax, Nova Scotia, before returning to Toronto in 1946. After her swimming career, Marilyn married Joe Di Lascio and moved to New Jersey, United States. They raised four children, Lisa, Michael, Jodi, and Janet, who were unaware of their mother's fame. Bell earned a BA, became an American citizen and was a teacher for over twenty years. Joe Di Lascio died in September 2007. Bell later moved to New Paltz, New York.

Due to a back injury and scoliosis, Bell gave up swimming in the early 2000s and used a motorized chair to get around. She was able to return to swimming in 2016 at her retirement home when swimming instructor Terry Laughlin helped her change her swimming style from a "classic '50s style" to one that did not put as much strain on her spine.

== Swimming career ==
Bell first took up swimming lessons in 1946 at Oakwood Pool, joining the Dolphinette Club coached by Alex Duff. In 1947, Bell entered her first long-distance race: a one-mile swim at the Canadian National Exhibition (CNE) in Lake Ontario. It was at that first race that Bell first met her future coach Gus Ryder, who was coach of the Lakeshore Swimming Club. Bell soon joined the Lakeshore Club and started practising at the indoor pool of Humberside Collegiate in Toronto.

In July 1954, Bell swam in the Centennial Marathon at Atlantic City, New Jersey. Bell finished first among the women's competitors, seventh overall, winning US$1,150. Fellow Lakeshore Swimming Club members Tom Park and Cliff Lumsden finished first and second. The course was 26 miles around Absecon Island in the Atlantic Ocean.

=== 1954 Lake Ontario swim ===
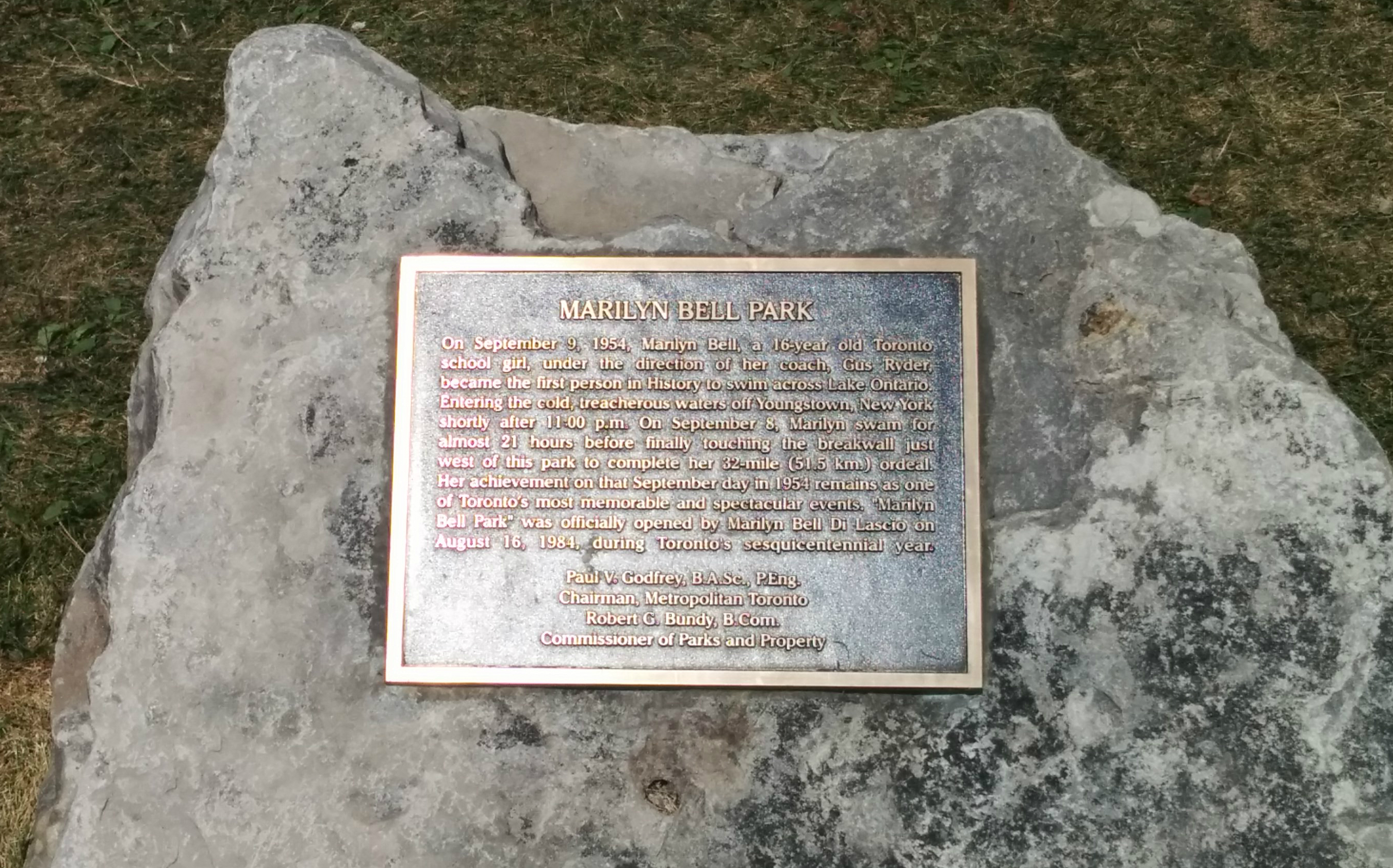
Dedication plaque for Marilyn Bell Park

On September 8, 1954, at 11:07 pm, Bell started her swim across Lake Ontario from Youngstown, New York, at virtually the same time as world-famous United States long-distance swimmer Florence Chadwick. The CNE had offered Chadwick CA$10,000 to swim the lake as a publicity effort for the annual exhibition. The offer to Chadwick had disappointed Canadian swimmers, Bell included, who had expected the CNE to hold a marathon race. Because of the criticism, the CNE decided to allow other swimmers, at first as part of a relay race, but Bell decided to try the whole swim herself. According to Bell, she "did it for Canada." Bell took on the challenge without pay with the encouragement of Alexandrine Gibb, a Toronto Daily Star reporter. A third swimmer, Torontonian Winnie Roach, who had swum the English Channel, also decided to swim the lake.

After several hours, Chadwick was forced to give up with stomach pains and vomiting at 6 am. Roach quit at about three-quarters distance, due to cramps. Bell swam for 20 hours and 59 minutes before she finally reached a breakwater near the Boulevard Club, west of the CNE grounds. The planned route straight across the lake was 51.5 kilometres (32.0 mi), but she actually had to swim much further because of strong winds and the lack of modern navigation equipment. Waves that day were almost 5 metres (16 ft) high, water temperature was 21 °C (70 °F) and lamprey eels were attacking her legs and arms.

Bell kept up her strength with Pablum, corn syrup, and lemon juice with water, along with heroic encouragement from her boat crew, including fellow swimmer Joan Cooke and her coach, Gus Ryder. Radio stations broadcast hourly reports of her progress and rival newspapers published "extra" editions throughout the day. At the start, Bell was accompanied by two boats, but a flotilla of boats gathered around her by mid-day. When she finally arrived at about 8:15 p.m., a crowd estimated at over 250,000 was gathered to see her arrive. CNE officials had hoped that Bell would arrive at the CNE waterfront, where a grandstand had been set up, but Ryder guided her to Sunnyside where the amusement park was brightly lit to aid her navigation, and the waves were smaller.

Bell was the first person to swim the 32-mile (51 km) distance. The CNE decided to give Bell the $10,000 prize, and she was later given numerous gifts, including a car, television, clothing, and furniture. Bell appeared on The Ed Sullivan Show. In an article, Bell later thanked the Toronto community for the support, especially Alexandrine Gibb, the Toronto Star reporter. Bell later recounted that she did not hear the crowds cheering when she arrived at the waterfront. Bell heard the cheering for the first time when she heard a recording made by a radio station a few days later.

Bell's swim was front-page news in Toronto. The Toronto Telegram, The Globe and Mail and the Toronto Daily Star all competed to get her interview. The Star had signed for an exclusive, providing boats to the swim team, but the Telegram tried to "scoop" the story by having a Telegram reporter pose as a nurse.

=== Other swims ===
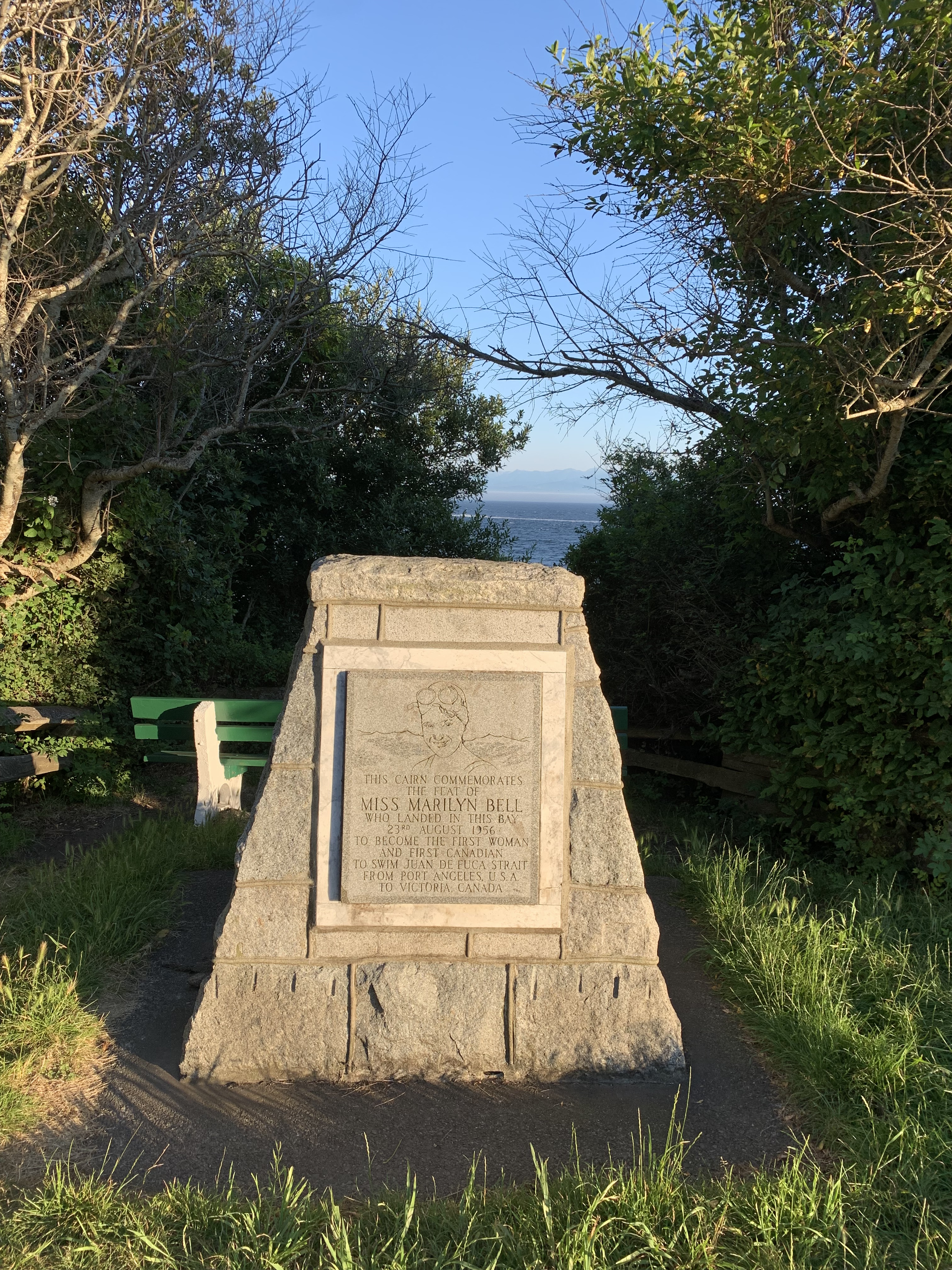
Cairn by Dallas Road Waterfront Trail (Victoria, BC, Canada) commemorating Marilyn Bell's historic swim across the Juan de Fuca Strait.

Offered $15,000 by the Toronto Telegram newspaper to swim the English Channel, Bell made the crossing in 14 hours, 36 minutes on July 31, 1955. Her crossing started at Cap Gris-Nez and ended at Abbotscliff, between Dover and Folkestone. At 17 years of age, she was the youngest swimmer to succeed in the crossing. She was guided by her coach Gus Ryder and John (Pop) Boswell. She did not beat the existing record for the crossing, hitting a strong current which took her past Dover Harbour. Bell returned to Toronto for a ticker tape parade along Bay Street to City Hall, attended by a crowd of 100,000 on August 19.

On August 23, 1956, she swam the Strait of Juan de Fuca off the Pacific coast, swimming from Port Angeles, Washington, to Victoria, British Columbia. It was her second attempt, after giving up after eight kilometres on her first attempt. A cairn by Dallas Road Waterfront Trail, below Beacon Hill Park in Victoria, overlooks the bay where she completed her swim.

== Awards and recognition ==
In 1954, Bell was named the Canadian Newsmaker of the Year by The Canadian Press, awarded the Lou Marsh Trophy as Canada's athlete of the year and awarded the Bobbie Rosenfeld Award as Canadian female athlete of the year. Bell was inducted into Canada's Sports Hall of Fame in 1958. In 1993 she entered the Canadian Swimming Hall of Fame and was named one of Canada's top athletes of the century. She was inducted into the Ontario Sports Hall of Fame in 1997. In 2003, Bell (now Marilyn Bell Di Lascio) was presented with the Order of Ontario.

The National Historic Sites and Monuments Board designated Bell's crossing of the lake a National Historic Event in 2005, and a federal plaque was erected in 2008 near the site of her landfall. Another plaque is mounted on the base of a statue of a lion along Lake Shore Boulevard by the CNE Ontario Government Building. A plaque commemorating her Strait of Juan de Fuca achievement is placed at her landing site in Beacon Hill Park.

Parkland near the location where Bell arrived is now named Marilyn Bell Park. In 2009, the Lakeshore Swimming Club of Toronto held the first annual Marilyn Bell Swim Classic, a meet sanctioned by Swim Ontario. In 2010, a ferry boat to serve the Toronto Island Airport was named the Marilyn Bell 1. The name was chosen as the top name in a contest held by the Toronto Port Authority.

The story of Bell's historic swim was told in the 2001 made-for-TV film Heart: The Marilyn Bell Story with Caroline Dhavernas portraying Marilyn Bell.

An experimental 16 mm film by Brenda Longfellow, Our Marilyn, was made in 1987, and was purchased by the National Gallery of Canada in 1990.
