= Marshal Cleland =

Canadian equestrian

William Marshal Cleland (June 14, 1912 – November 5, 1958) was a Canadian equestrian champion.

== Early life ==
Cleland was born in Hamilton, Ontario into a horse-riding family. His grandfather and father—a successful distillery executive and horse breeder—were both named William, so he was known by his middle name, which he was given in honour of Hamilton's Billy Marshall, a long-distance runner. Cleland got his first horse at the age of seven. He attended Hillcrest School in Hamilton and Trinity College School in Port Hope, Ontario where he was a sprinter and football player.

== Sporting achievements ==
In 1937, at the age of 25, and while serving as a lieutenant in the Governor General of Canada's guard, Cleland and the Canadian Army equestrian team won 10 international championships, including four at the New York horse show at Madison Square Garden, three at the Chicago horse show, and three at the Royal Winter Fair in Toronto. That earned him the Lou Marsh Trophy as Canada's top athlete of 1937.

Other career highlights
1925 C.N.E Exhibition Horse Show – 1st place in Middleweight Class
1929 C.N.E Exhibition Horse Show – 2nd place Open Jumpers Class
1930 Royal Agricultural Winter Fair – 2nd place Middle Weight class
1931 International Military Jumping Competition – 1st place
1932 Royal Agricultural Winter Fair – 1st place Military Class
1933 Royal Agricultural Winter Fair – 1st place Military Class

== Personal ==
Cleland married Charlotte Mary Law in 1939. They had four sons: William (1944), Donald (1947), Bruce (1949) and Peter (1957). He served in the Canadian military during the Second World War and later worked at a stock brokerage in Toronto. Cleland died in Oakville in 1958 at age 46.
