= Betty Stanhope-Cole =

Canadian golfer

Personal information
- Nationality: Canada
- Born: September 21, 1937 Calgary, Alberta, Canada
- Died: January 27, 2017 (aged 79) Edmonton, Alberta, Canada
- Children: 2

Career
- Sport: Golf
- Status: Amateur

Betty Stanhope-Cole (September 21, 1937 – January 27, 2017) was a Canadian amateur golfer. She is a member of the Canadian Golf Hall of Fame.

== Early life ==
Stanhope-Cole was born in Calgary and moved to Edmonton in her teen years. In her younger years, she played tennis. She was taught how to golf by Edmonton golf pros Alex Olynyk and Henry Martell.

== Career ==
In 1974 and 1976, she was ranked as the top women's golfer in Canada. She was Canadian Junior Girls champion in 1956, Canadian Women's Amateur champion in 1957, and Canadian Ladies' Close champion in 1967. She has also been a member of the Canadian Commonwealth Golf Team (1963, 1971) and Canadian World Team (1964, 1974, and 1976). In 1980, she was inducted into the Alberta Sports Hall of Fame. Stanhope-Cole is also a former curler, having won three Alberta championships as skip.

== Achievements ==
- 1957 Alberta Golf – Ladies Amateur Championship
- 1958 Alberta Golf – Ladies Amateur Championship
- 1959 Alberta Golf – Ladies Amateur Championship
- 1963 Alberta Golf – Ladies Amateur Championship
- 1966 Alberta Golf – Ladies Amateur Championship
- 1967 Alberta Golf – Ladies Amateur Championship
- 1968 Alberta Golf – Ladies Amateur Championship
- 1969 Alberta Golf – Ladies Amateur Championship
- 1972 Alberta Golf – Ladies Amateur Championship
- 1974 Alberta Golf – Ladies Amateur Championship
- 1975 Alberta Golf – Ladies Amateur Championship
- 1976 Alberta Golf – Ladies Amateur Championship
- 1979 Alberta Golf – Ladies Amateur Championship
- 1980 Alberta Golf – Ladies Amateur Championship
- 1980 – Alberta Sports Hall of Fame (Curling & Golf)
- 1982 Alberta Golf – Ladies Amateur Championship
- 1984 Alberta Golf – Ladies Amateur Championship
- 1988 Alberta Golf – Ladies Amateur Championship
- 1989 – #1 ranked senior amateur in Canada.
- 1991 – Canadian Golf Hall of Fame
- 1993 – Edmonton Sports Hall of Fame
- 2005 – Alberta Golf Hall of Fame
- 2005 – Alberta Centennial Salute for Sport and Recreation Award
- 2011 – Edmonton park named in her honour

== Legacy ==
Betty Stanhope-Cole Park in Edmonton is named for her.

== Death ==
Stanhope-Cole died of cancer in Edmonton on January 27, 2017.

== Team appearances ==
Amateur

- Espirito Santo Trophy (representing Canada): 1964, 1974, 1976
