= Velma Springstead =

Canadian athlete

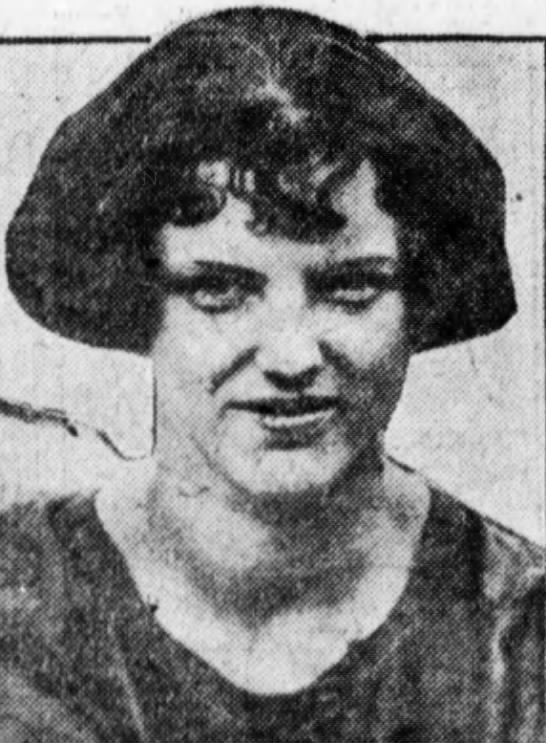

Personal information
- Born: August 22, 1906 Hamilton, Ontario
- Died: March 27, 1927 (aged 20) Hamilton, Ontario

Sport
- Country: Canada
- Sport: Athletics
Medal record
Track and field
Representing Canada
Canadian Track and Field Championships
Gold medal – first place	1925 Halifax	Women's High Jump

Velma Springstead (22 August 1906 – 27 March 1927) was a Canadian track and field athlete. Springstead won the gold medal in high jump during the 1925 Canadian Track and Field Championships and became a member of the first women's track and field team of Canada to compete internationally. After her death, Springstead was posthumously honoured with the creation of the Velma Springstead Trophy and was inducted into the Hamilton Sports Hall of Fame in 2011.

== Early life and education ==
Springstead was born on 22 August 1906 in Hamilton, Ontario.

== Career ==
In July 1925, Springstead participated in a track and field qualification held at Varsity Stadium for the Amateur Athletic Union of Canada. Her performance earned her a spot on the first women's track and field team of Canada to compete in an international event. The following month, Springstead was third in the high jump event alongside a fourth place finish in the hurdles event at a 1925 track and field meet in London, England. After the meet, Springstead was presented a trophy by Lord Decies for her courage.

The same year, Springstead won gold at the 1925 Canadian Track and Field Championships in the high jump event. Outside of her athletic career, Springstead worked for Calvin Presbyterian Church as a teacher and was a secretary for Tuckett Tobacco Company.

== Death ==
On 27 March 1927, Springstead died of pneumonia in Hamilton, Ontario.

== Awards and honours ==
After her death, the Velma Springstead Trophy was created to award the best Canadian sportswoman of the year. In 2011, Springstead was posthumously inducted into the Hamilton Sports Hall of Fame.
