= Ada Mackenzie =

Canadian golfer (1891–1973)

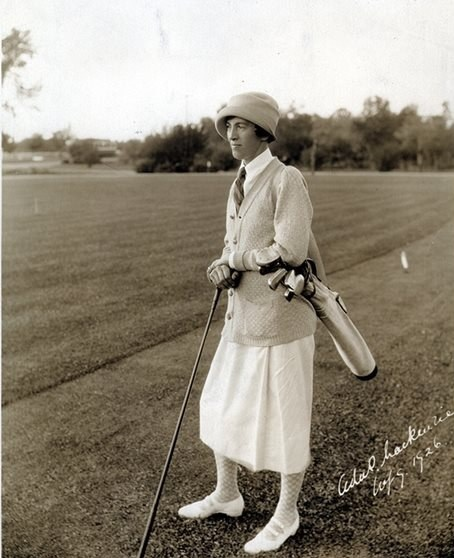
- Mackenzie in 1926

Personal information
- Nationality: Canada
- Born: October 30, 1891 Toronto, Ontario, Canada
- Died: January 25, 1973 (aged 81) Richmond Hill, Ontario, Canada

Career
- Sport: Golf
- Status: Amateur

Achievements and awards
- Canada Sports Hall of Fame: 1955
- Canadian Golf Hall of Fame: 1971

Ada Charlotte Mackenzie (October 30, 1891 – January 25, 1973) was a Canadian golfer who founded the Ladies Golf Club of Toronto in 1924. In 1933, Mackenzie was the second athlete chosen as The Canadian Press outstanding female athlete of the year. She was inducted into numerous halls of fame including the Canada Sports Hall of Fame in 1955 and the Canadian Golf Hall of Fame in 1971.

== Early life and education ==
Mackenzie was born on October 30, 1891, in Toronto, Ontario. She went to Havergal College from 1903 to 1911 and became interested in sports like her parents, who were golfers. At Havergal, Mackenzie played various sports including cricket and tennis and was the college's top athlete three years in a row.

== Career ==
After completing her schooling at Havergal College in 1911, she remained at the college as an instructor until 1914. After leaving Havergal College, Mackenzie worked for the Canadian Bank of Commerce until 1930.

=== Golf career ===
In 1924, Mackenzie created the Ladies Golf Club of Toronto in response to the time restrictions she was given as a woman golfer; women golfers could only access afternoon playing hours on many courses. She bought the land in what is now Markham, Ontario posing as a married person as there were restrictions on women buying land in Ontario at that time, then worked with famed course architect Stanley Thompson to plan the layout. Later in 1930, she opened up a women's sportswear store after she felt that the women's golf apparel at that time was not appropriate.

On the golf course, Mackenzie competed in various golf tournaments throughout North America and Bermuda. Her first tournament win was at the Canadian Women's Amateur in 1919, which she won five times throughout her career. Outside of Canada, Mackenzie medalled at the U.S. Women's Amateur in 1927. Mackenzie's last golf tournament win was at the Ontario Senior Women's Amateur in 1969.

== Awards and achievements ==
In 1933, Mackenzie was named the outstanding female athlete of the year by The Canadian Press. Mackenzie was inducted in the Canada Sports Hall of Fame in 1955 and both the Canadian Golf Hall of Fame and the Canadian Olympic Hall of Fame in 1971. After her death, Mackenzie was posthumously inducted into the Ontario Golf Hall of Fame in 2000 and the Ontario Sports Hall of Fame in 2003.

Two municipal parks in Ontario, one each in Richmond Hill and Markham, are named after her.

== Death ==
On January 25, 1973, Mackenzie died in Toronto, Ontario.

== Amateur wins ==
- 1919 Canadian Women's Amateur
- 1925 Canadian Women's Amateur
- 1926 Canadian Women's Amateur, Canadian Ladies' Close Championship
- 1927 Canadian Ladies' Close Championship
- 1929 Canadian Ladies' Close Championship
- 1931 Canadian Ladies' Close Championship
- 1933 Canadian Women's Amateur, Canadian Ladies' Close Championship
- 1935 Canadian Women's Amateur
- 1937 Bermuda Tournament
- 1955 Canadian Senior Women's Championship
- 1958 Bercanus Tournament
- 1960 Canadian Senior Women's Championship
- 1962 Canadian Senior Women's Championship
- 1965 Canadian Senior Women's Championship, Ontario Senior Women's Championship
- 1969 Ontario Senior Women's Championship
