= Marlene Streit =

Canadian golfer

Personal information
- Full name: Marlene Stewart Streit
- Nationality: Canada
- Born: March 9, 1934 (age 92) Cereal, Alberta, Canada

Career
- Sport: Golf
- College: Rollins College
- Status: Amateur

Best results in LPGA major championships
- Chevron Championship: DNP
- Women's PGA C'ship: DNP
- U.S. Women's Open: T7: 1961
- du Maurier Classic: 76th: 1985

Achievements and awards
- World Golf Hall of Fame: 2004 (member page)
- Lou Marsh Trophy: 1951, 1956
- Bobbie Rosenfeld Award: 1952, 1953, 1956, 1963
- Canada's Sports Hall of Fame: 1962
- Canadian Golf Hall of Fame: 1971

Marlene Stewart Streit, OC OOnt (born March 9, 1934) is a retired Canadian amateur golfer, and a member of the World Golf Hall of Fame.

== Career ==
She was born in Cereal, Alberta. She learned golf from Gordon McInnis Sr. at the Lookout Point Golf Club in Fonthill, Ontario.

She is the most successful Canadian amateur female golfer, and the only golfer in history to have won the Australian, British, Canadian and U.S. Women's Amateurs.

She graduated from Rollins College in 1956 and won the national individual intercollegiate golf championship that same year.

Streit was a member of the Canadian team at the Espirito Santo Trophy in 1966, 1970, 1972, and 1984.

She won the Bobbie Rosenfeld Award for best Canadian female athlete for the fifth time in 1963.

== Personal life ==
She owns a home in Wellington, Florida.

== Amateur wins ==
- 1951 Canadian Women's Amateur, Ontario Ladies' Amateur, CLGA Close Amateurs
- 1952 CLGA Close Amateurs
- 1953 British Ladies Amateur, CLGA Close Amateurs
- 1954 Canadian Women's Amateur, CLGA Close Amateurs
- 1955 Canadian Women's Amateur, CLGA Close Amateurs
- 1956 U.S. Women's Amateur, North and South Women's Amateur, Ontario Ladies' Amateur, Canadian Women's Amateur, CLGA Close Amateurs, U.S. Women's Intercollegiate Championship
- 1957 Ontario Ladies' Amateur, CLGA Close Amateurs
- 1958 Ontario Ladies' Amateur, Canadian Women's Amateur
- 1959 Canadian Women's Amateur
- 1963 Australian Women's Amateur, Canadian Women's Amateur, CLGA Close Amateurs
- 1968 Ontario Ladies' Amateur, Canadian Women's Amateur, CLGA Close Amateurs
- 1969 Ontario Ladies' Amateur, Canadian Women's Amateur
- 1970 Ontario Ladies' Amateur
- 1972 Ontario Ladies' Amateur, Canadian Women's Amateur
- 1973 Canadian Women's Amateur
- 1974 North and South Women's Amateur, Ontario Ladies' Amateur
- 1976 Ontario Ladies' Amateur
- 1977 Ontario Ladies' Amateur
- 1985 U.S. Senior Women's Amateur, CLGA Senior Women's Amateur
- 1987 CLGA Senior Women's Amateur
- 1988 CLGA Senior Women's Amateur
- 1993 CLGA Senior Women's Amateur
- 1994 U.S. Senior Women's Amateur
- 2003 U.S. Senior Women's Amateur

== Awards and honours ==
- In 1951 and 1956, Streit was awarded the Lou Marsh Trophy.
- She won the Bobbie Rosenfeld Award five times: in 1952, 1953, 1956, 1957, and 1963.
- In 1962, Streit was inducted into Canada's Sports Hall of Fame.
- In 1967, she was made an Officer of the Order of Canada.
- In 1971, Streit was inducted into the Canadian Golf Hall of Fame.
- In 1995, she was inducted into the Ontario Sports Hall of Fame.
- In 2000, Streit was inducted into the Ontario Golf Hall of Fame.
- In 2004, she was the first Canadian inducted into the World Golf Hall of Fame.
- In 2006, Streit was made a member of the Order of Ontario.

== Team appearances ==
Amateur

- Espirito Santo Trophy (representing Canada): 1966, 1970, 1972, 1984
