= Canadian Women's Amateur =

Golf tournament held in Canada

The Canadian Women's Amateur is Canada's annual national amateur golf tournament for women. It is open to women from all countries and is played at a different course each year.

== History ==
The first championship was held from October 14 to 17, 1901, at Royal Montreal Golf Club. The 50 or so entries played 18 holes of stroke play on the first afternoon, after which the leading eight ladies played three rounds of 18-hole match play on the following three days. Local member Lily Young had the best score on the first day, 99. Scorers of 107 and better reached the quarter-finals. Consolation events were organised for those not in the leading eight. Young reached the final with two comfortable wins where she met Mabel Thomson, of New Brunswick, who only won her semi-final at the 20th hole. Young won the final 2&1.

== Winners ==
- 2026 Rina Kawasaki
- 2025 Michelle Xing
- 2024 Yurang Li
- 2023 Lauren Kim
- 2022 Monet Chun
- 2021 Lauren Zaretsky
- 2020 Canceled
- 2019 Brianna Navarrosa
- 2018 Yealimi Noh
- 2017 Jennifer Kupcho
- 2016 Choi Hye-jin
- 2015 Mariel Galdiano
- 2014 Augusta James
- 2013 Brooke Henderson
- 2012 Ariya Jutanugarn
- 2011 Rebecca Lee-Bentham
- 2010 Sydnee Michaels
- 2009 Jennifer Kirby
- 2008 Stacey Keating
- 2007 Stephanie Sherlock
- 2006 Jessica Potter
- 2005 Laura Matthews
- 2004 Mary Anne Lapointe
- 2003 Lisa Meldrum
- 2002 Lisa Meldrum
- 2001 Lisa Meldrum
- 2000 Jan Dowling
- 1999 Mary Anne Lapointe
- 1998 Kareen Qually
- 1997 Anna-Jane Eathorne
- 1996 Mary Anne Lapointe
- 1995 Tracey Lipp
- 1994 Aileen Robertson
- 1993 Mary Anne Lapointe
- 1992 Marie-Josee Rouleau
- 1991 Adele Moore
- 1990 Sarah LeBrun Ingram
- 1989 Cheryll Damphouse
- 1988 Michiko Hattori
- 1987 Tracy Kerdyk
- 1986 Marilyn Palmer O'Connor
- 1985 Kimberley Williams
- 1984 Kimberley Williams
- 1983 Dawn Coe
- 1982 Cindy Pleger
- 1981 Jane Lock
- 1980 Edwina Kennedy
- 1979 Stacey West
- 1978 Cathy Sherk
- 1977 Cathy Sherk
- 1976 Debbie Massey
- 1975 Debbie Massey
- 1974 Debbie Massey
- 1973 Marlene Streit
- 1972 Marlene Streit
- 1971 Jocelyne Bourassa
- 1970 Gail Harvey Moore
- 1969 Marlene Streit
- 1968 Marlene Streit
- 1967 Bridget Jackson
- 1966 Helene Gagnon
- 1965 Jocelyne Bourassa
- 1964 Margie Masters
- 1963 Marlene Streit
- 1962 Gayle Hitchens
- 1961 Judy Darling
- 1960 Judy Darling
- 1959 Marlene Streit
- 1958 Marlene Streit
- 1957 Betty Stanhope
- 1956 Marlene Stewart
- 1955 Marlene Stewart
- 1954 Marlene Stewart
- 1953 Barbara Romack
- 1952 Edean Anderson
- 1951 Marlene Stewart
- 1950 Dorothy Keilty
- 1949 Grace DeMoss
- 1948 Grace Lenczyk
- 1947 Grace Lenczyk
- 1939–1946 No tournament
- 1938 Marion Mulqueen
- 1937 Mrs. John Rogers
- 1936 Dora Darling
- 1935 Ada Mackenzie
- 1934 Alexa Stirling Fraser
- 1933 Ada Mackenzie
- 1932 Margery Kirkham
- 1931 Maureen Orcutt
- 1930 Maureen Orcutt
- 1929 Helen Hicks
- 1928 Virginia Wilson
- 1927 Helen Payson
- 1926 Ada Mackenzie
- 1925 Ada Mackenzie
- 1924 Glenna Collett
- 1923 Glenna Collett
- 1922 Margaret Gavin
- 1921 Cecil Leitch
- 1920 Alexa Stirling
- 1919 Ada Mackenzie
- 1914–1918 No tournament
- 1913 Muriel Dodd
- 1912 Dorothy Campbell
- 1911 Dorothy Campbell
- 1910 Dorothy Campbell
- 1909 Violet Henry-Anderson
- 1908 Mabel Thomson
- 1907 Mabel Thomson
- 1906 Mabel Thomson
- 1905 Mabel Thomson
- 1904 Florence Harvey
- 1903 Florence Harvey
- 1902 Mabel Thomson
- 1901 Lily Young

== Multiple winners ==
The following women have won the tournament more than once:

- 11: Marlene Stewart Streit
- 5: Ada Mackenzie, Mabel Thomson
- 4: Mary Anne Lapointe
- 3: Dorothy Campbell, Debbie Massey, Lisa Meldrum
- 2: Jocelyne Bourassa, Glenna Collett, Judy Darling, Florence Harvey, Grace Lenczyk, Maureen Orcutt, Cathy Sherk, Alexa Stirling Fraser, Kimberley Williams

== World Golf Hall of Fame winners ==
Three championship winners have been inducted into the World Golf Hall of Fame: Dorothy Campbell, Glenna Collett, and Marlene Stewart Streit. All three remained amateurs for their competitive golf careers.
