= Edmonton Grads =

Edmonton Commercial Grads
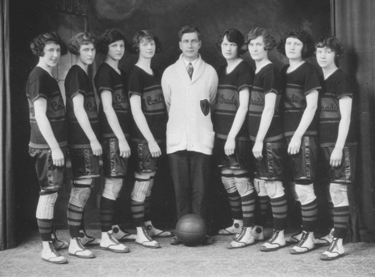
- Division: Dominion of Canada’s women’s basketball
- Founded: 1912
- Folded: 1940
- History: Edmonton Grads 1912–1940
- Location: Edmonton, Alberta, Canada
- Head coach: John Percy Page

The Edmonton Grads were a Canadian women's basketball team based in Edmonton, Alberta, Canada active from 1912 – 1940. The team continues to hold the North American record for the women's sports team with the best winning percentage. The Grads won the first women's world title in basketball in 1924.

== Team history ==
=== Origins ===
In 1912, 25-year-old teacher John Percy Page had moved from Ontario to Edmonton, Alberta, where he was employed by local high schools to organize commercial classes. Page soon taught commercial classes at the newly established McDougall High School. When Page decided to organize basketball teams for the school, his teaching assistant chose to coach the boys team, while Page coached the girls. Despite having only a basic knowledge of basketball, Page improved his understanding of the sport through study. He held practices twice-weekly. The high school had no gymnasium, so students practiced basketball on an outdoor court throughout the year, even during frigid winter weather. Beginning their first year of competitive play in 1914, the McDougall High School girls team won a local high school tournament.

Upon graduation from McDougall High School in mid-1915, the team members decided they wanted to continue playing basketball, establishing what eventually became the Commercial Graduates Basketball Club. Their new basketball team was called the Commercial Graduates (known informally as "the Grads"). Page remained coach for the team. Members were recruited primarily from McDougall High School students and graduates, but also from other business and technical schools. Page also established a feeder system to train and recruit his new players: promising high school students were invited to join a secondary team called the Gradettes, and the best Gradettes were promoted to the Grads whenever a space opened up.

=== Early years ===
In 1915, the Grads defeated women's basketball teams across Alberta to become provincial champions. Teams were allowed to challenge the title holders to a match at any time during the year—with a three-month wait between rematches, if defeated—and the Grads successfully held on to their trophy for the next several years. In 1917, with a growing reputation for beating all challengers, the Grads retained their provincial champion status without needing to defend it once.

On April 27, 1919, the University of Alberta Varsity team challenged the Grads, winning the match by two points and taking the trophy. In November of that year, the Grads had a rematch and successfully regained their title as provincial champions. The University of Alberta challenged the Grads again in April 1920 and lost the match, but immediately demanded another game, complaining that the Grads had improperly allowed a younger high-school-aged player on their team. After another game, the Grads lost the title to their rivals once more.

=== North American Underwood Trophy ===
In 1923, Canadian and American women's basketball champion teams competed for the first international Underwood Trophy. The Edmonton Grads faced off against the Cleveland Favorite-Knits and defeated them with a two-game score of 53–33, becoming the inaugural Underwood Trophy winners.

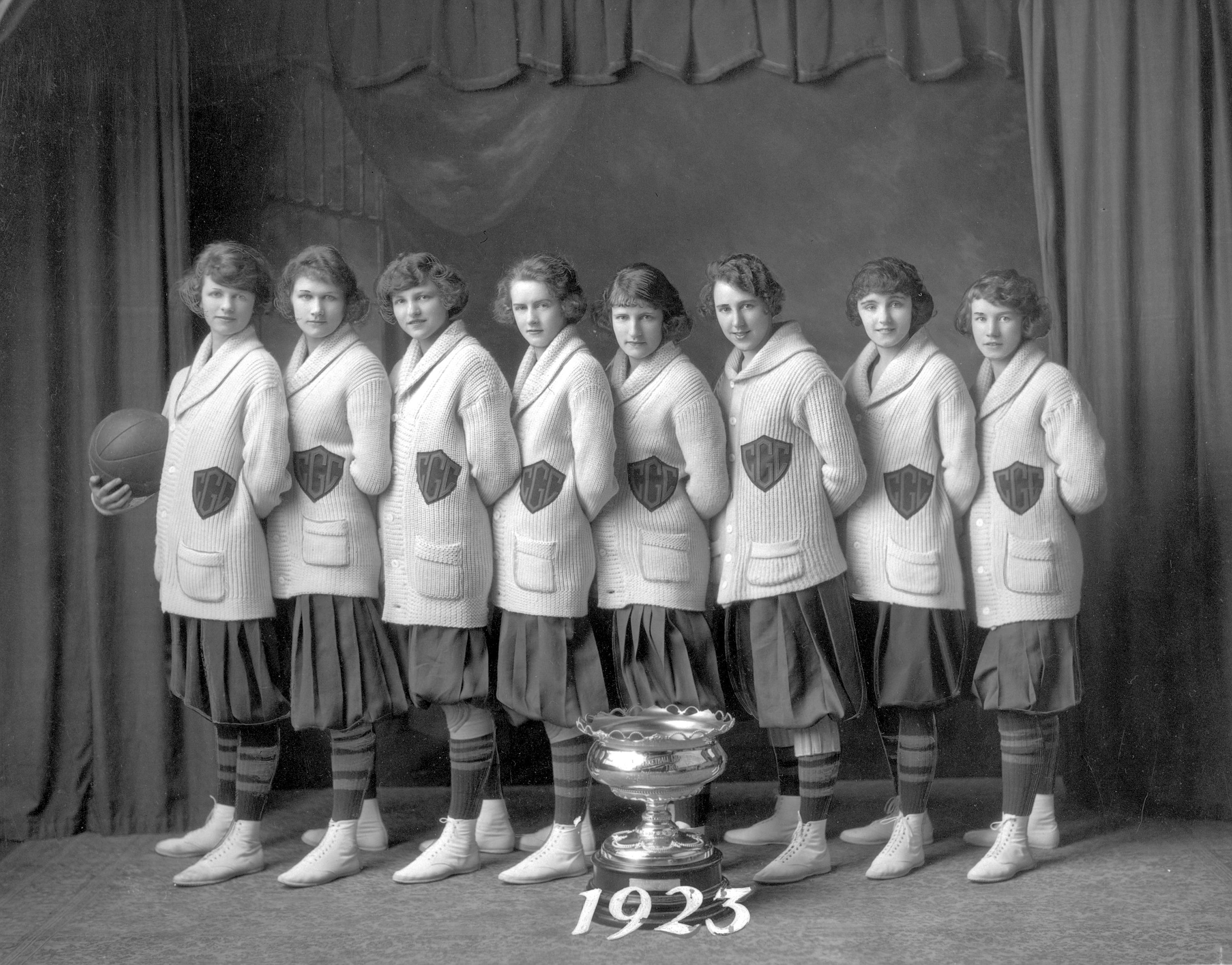
The Edmonton Grads in 1923, winners of the first Underwood International Trophy

=== Olympic games ===
The Grads retained their amateur status to make sure they would be eligible for the Olympics if basketball was made an official Olympic sport. In 1924, the Grads were invited to play at the summer Olympic games in Paris. They won every game, defeating women's teams from Paris, Roubaix, Strasbourg and Lille with an average score of 60–10. After their final match, the team traveled through Europe on holiday. Page and two of his players — Winnie Martin and Daisy Johnson — returned to Paris for the third congress of the Fédération Sportive Féminine Internationale (International Women's Sports Federation). The federation formally admitted Canada as a member and declared the Grads world basketball champions, permitting the team to hold the title until the next world games.

Returning home as world champions, the Grads gained new sponsors and financial support in Canada. Page secured the Edmonton Arena as a permanent home venue for the team. Although the Grads were hopeful of returning to Europe for the Women's World Games of 1926, basketball was not included at that year's event, and the Grads remained in North America to compete against Canadian and American teams.

Over the next two years, the Grads advocated for the inclusion of basketball — both men's and women's — as a sport at the 1928 Summer Olympics. Despite support from the Canadian Olympic Committee, this request was denied by the International Olympic Committee, and basketball did not receive a place on the program. However, the Fédération Sportive Féminine Internationale had organized a European women's basketball tour in cooperation with the Olympics, and the federation invited the Grads to travel to Amsterdam, Netherlands, to defend their world title. After winning the Canadian women's championship of 1928, the Grads arrived in Europe and played nine matches. They won every match, beating most teams by 60 or 70 points, and the Grads finished their tour by defeating the French champions by 46–14.

In addition to dominating their sport in North America, the Grads also took on the best teams in Europe, ultimately defeating challengers in Paris, London, Amsterdam, and Berlin. The Grads swept four consecutive Olympic Games from 1924 to 1936, winning all 24 Olympic matches they played. This achievement was unrecognized on the medal podium, however, as women's basketball did not become an official Olympic sport until the 1976 summer games in Montreal.

=== Disbandment ===
In 1940, the Royal Canadian Air Force took over the Edmonton Arena for wartime use, depriving the Grads of a local space in which to play against international teams. The commencement of World War II disrupted regular basketball competition throughout Europe and beyond, causing the cancellation of tournaments and championships and making it increasingly difficult for sports teams to travel. Additionally, despite Page's continuous efforts to find suitable competition over the years, no team had ever proven themselves consistently good enough to be a clear rival for the Grads. The Grads' dominance in basketball no longer attracted the same attention it had before, and regular game attendance had been shrinking.

In May 1940, the Grads won their last Canadian championship before disbanding. Dr. James Naismith, the inventor of basketball, called the Grads the "finest basketball team that ever stepped out on a floor."

Some Grads players went on to join other Canadian basketball teams, such as the Comets and the Hedlunds. The Grads continued to stay in touch with each other after disbandment, meeting for reunions every four years. In 1961, the Grads decided to form an official organization to help them stay connected and answer public inquiries about the team. They established the Edmonton Grads Club, beginning to collect and preserve archive material and memorabilia, and the group continued to hold official reunions until 1987.

On July 23, 2018, the last surviving member of the Grads, Kay MacBeth, died at the age of 96.

== Head coach ==
Page encouraged his players to "play basketball, think basketball, and dream basketball." He put firm emphasis on the moral behavior of his team, insisting that the Grads strive for a clean game at all times. During road trips, Page enforced a curfew, and players were discouraged from drinking or smoking. He was described by his players as "a nice man and a wonderful gentleman".

After the team disbanded in 1940, Page was subsequently elected to the Alberta legislature, where he served as a politician until 1959. In late 1959, at the age of 72, Page became lieutenant-governor of Alberta. He held the position until 1966. Page died in 1973, due to complications of pneumonia.

== Record ==
Official records have traditionally stated that the Grads played a total of 522 official games between 1915 and 1940, with 502 wins and 20 losses. This gives the team an overall win-loss percentage of 96.2%.

Biographer M. Ann Hall has suggested that this total number of games played (522) may be incorrect, partially because official record-keeping of the Grads' games only began to be taken seriously after their national championship win in 1922. Based on her research, Hall proposes that the Grads played a total of 412 games, with 392 wins and 20 losses. This approach would affect the team's winning percentage only slightly (95.1%).

== Legacy ==
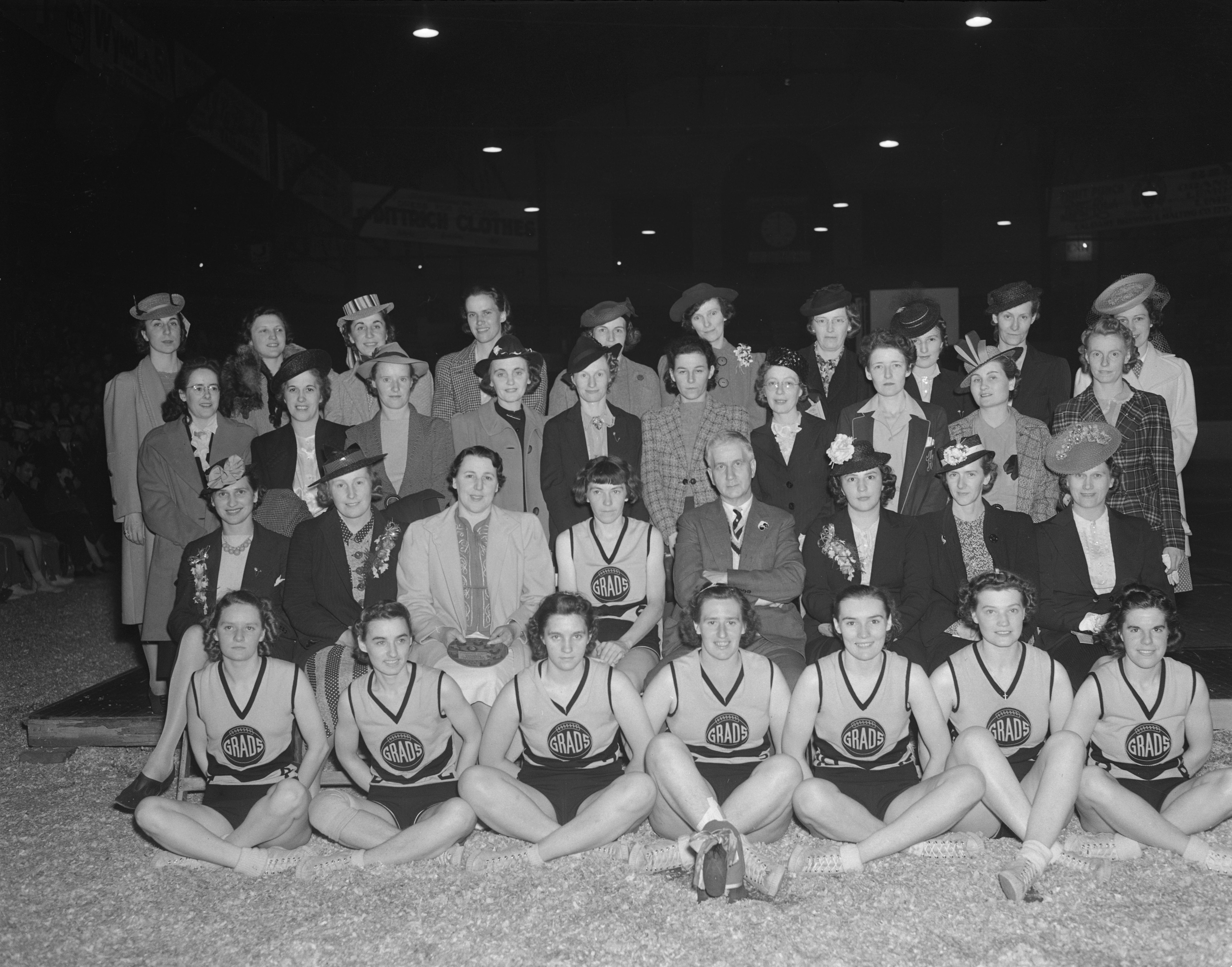
The final Edmonton Grads roster, joined by former players, photographed July 3, 1940

As the most successful women's basketball team of the early 20th century, the Edmonton Grads made news headlines across North America and as far away as Hong Kong and the Philippines. Their success had a strong impact on public attitudes towards female athletes, making it more socially acceptable for women to play sports. The Grads National Basketball Championship in 1932 was essential to the Edmonton Rustlers women's hockey team, helping them gain support to travel east and play the Preston Rivulettes for the national hockey title.

When the Canadian Press polled sportscasters and sports editors across the country in 1950, the Grads were voted Canada's greatest basketball team of the first half of the 20th century. In 1976 the Grads' success was designated a National Historic Event. Two years later, Parks Canada dedicated a plaque in the team's honour. In 1983, the Canada Basketball Hall of Fame inducted the entire team roster of 38 players. In 1987, the National Film Board released a documentary about the team entitled Shooting Stars. In the late 1980s, the city of Edmonton established Edmonton Grads Park in Westmount, installing a permanent historical display.

In 2010, the Women's Basketball Hall of Fame in Knoxville, Tennessee, commemorated the Grads with an honorary plaque. In 2014, Canada Basketball launched its first Edmonton Grads International Classic event, named in honour of the Grads. Taking place every two years, this event has pitted the Canada women's national basketball team against teams from Brazil, China and Turkey. A non-profit organization called the Edmonton Grads Basketball Centre currently operates out of the Saville Centre in Edmonton, where they offer summer basketball programs for girls. In 2015, a mural dedicated to the Grads was unveiled at the Saville Centre, and the board of governors of the Edmonton Grads Basketball Centre announced they would begin awarding an annual Commercial Grads scholarship to members of the University of Alberta Pandas women's basketball team.

The Grads were awarded the Order of Sport and inducted into Canada's Sports Hall of Fame in 2017. That same year, Historica Canada released a Heritage Minute clip about the team for International Women's Day.

On November 9, 2019, the Grads were featured in a Google Doodle celebrating the team.

== See also ==
- Edmonton Rustlers
- Timeline of women's basketball history
