= Hilda Ranscombe =

Canadian ice hockey player (1913–1998)

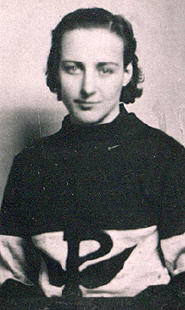
- Born: September 3, 1913; Doon, Ontario, Canada
- Died: August 25, 1998 (aged 84); Cambridge, Ontario, Canada
- Known for: Preston Rivulettes team captain
- Awards: Canada's Sports Hall of Fame

Hilda Doris Ranscombe (September 3, 1913 – August 25, 1998) was a Canadian ice hockey player. She served for ten seasons as the Preston Rivulettes captain, and led the team to ten consecutive Ladies Ontario Hockey Association championships, five Eastern Canadian titles, and four national championships. She was considered one of the best female hockey players of her time, possessing natural speed and talent, that compared to players in the National Hockey League. Ranscombe was twice a finalist for the Lou Marsh Trophy, and twice inducted into Canada's Sports Hall of Fame–as an individual athlete in 2015, and as a member of the Rivulettes in 2022.

== Early life ==
Hilda Doris Ranscombe was born on September 3, 1913, in Doon, Ontario, according to her birth certificate; however, the Cambridge Sports Hall of Fame lists September 11, 1913, as her birth date. Both of her parents were born in England. Her father George was born in Berkshire, and her mother Ada Amato was born in Oxfordshire. She was the youngest of nine children, and had six sisters and two brothers.

Ranscombe learned how to skate on Cressman Pond near the family home, and played ice hockey against boys on the Grand River in Preston. She began a hockey career when her summer softball team became an ice hockey team for the winter.

== Ice hockey career ==
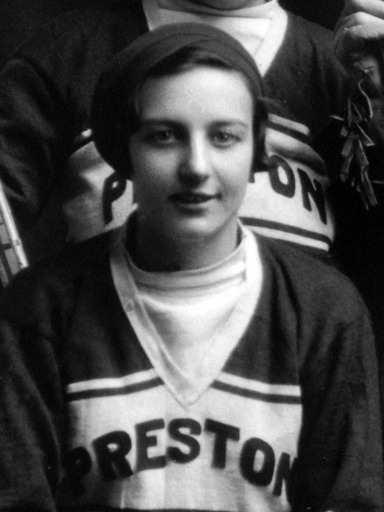
Ranscombe in a Preston Rivulettes team photo

Ranscombe became a standout right winger for the Preston Rivulettes due to her speed and stick handling abilities. She served as the Rivulettes team's captain for all ten seasons, and was credited as being the "heart and soul of the team". Teammate Ruth Dagel said that "Hilda took me under her wing, showing me some of the finer skills and how to be a professional both on and off the ice. She was our captain, and patiently and enthusiastically shared her knowledge and love of the sport". Ranscombe declined the spotlight for herself and said that "the whole team was the most valuable player".

Ranscombe was a high-scoring player, but no official statistics were kept. During a practice at the Galt Arena Gardens, she scored on Terry Sawchuk by luring him out of the net. She and her sister Nellie received offers to play in Montreal, but declined to stay in Preston. In 1938, Bobbie Rosenfeld nominated Ranscombe for the Norman Craig Memorial trophy awarded to the most outstanding female athlete in Ontario, and described Ranscombe as a "natural and gifted player", who "looks invincible with puck and stick". Ranscombe was also a finalist for the Lou Marsh Trophy on two occasions, as Canada’s Athlete of the Year.

During the ten years in which Ranscombe was the Preston captain, the Rivulettes played approximately 350 games, with only two losses and three ties. The team won the Ladies Ontario Hockey Association championship ten consecutive times from 1931 to 1940, and then won five Eastern Canadian titles, and four national championships. The team disbanded due to the onset of World War II, and cancelled a planned playing tour of Europe. After her playing days, Ranscombe remained involved in hockey as a coach.

== Honours ==
Ranscombe was inducted into the Cambridge Sports Hall of Fame in 1997 as a member of the Preston Rivulettes. In May 1998, she was inducted into the same hall as an individual athlete, and the Cambridge Sports Hall of Fame posthumously named Ranscombe its female athlete of the 20th century, in 1999. She was inducted into Canada's Sports Hall of Fame as an individual in 2015, and inducted again as a member of the Preston Rivulettes in 2022. Ranscombe was also inducted into the Waterloo Region Hall of Fame as both an individual athlete, and as a member of the Rivulettes.

== Personal life ==
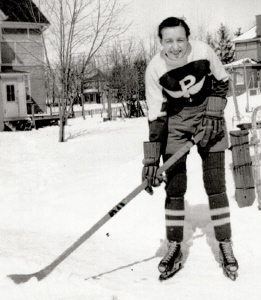
Ranscombe practicing outdoors with the Preston Rivulettes

Ranscombe enjoyed playing other sports including softball, golf, tennis and bowling. She followed hockey on television, and specifically the Canada women's national ice hockey team. She was active in the congregation of St. John's Anglican Church. Ranscombe died August 25, 1998, and her cremated remains were interred at Parklawn Cemetery in Cambridge, Ontario.

== Legacy ==
Canada's Sports Hall of Fame states that Ranscombe was "one of hockey's greatest players" and credits her for increasing the popularity of women's ice hockey, and allowing the women's league in Ontario to prosper. Detroit Red Wings player Carl Liscombe said that "Hilda was just as good as any boy, and better than most, myself included. When we picked teams, she was always the first one chosen", in reference to playing pond hockey in Cambridge. Mary McGuire from the Stratford Aces, said that "Hilda was without a doubt, the best female hockey player in the world". A book of testimonials and letters from her opponents and spectators is at the Hockey Hall of Fame, and includes claims that she was the "Wayne Gretzky of women’s hockey", and references to her as the Aurèle Joliat or Gordie Howe of her time.

In 1963, Ranscombe made arrangements to have the Rivulettes accomplishments displayed in the Hockey Hall of Fame, which included donating her equipment. Pieces of Ranscombe's uniform and equipment are also in a display at the Cambridge Sports Hall of Fame. Her jersey and some equipment were also displayed at the Canadian Museum of History in 2017. The Historic Sites and Monuments Board of Canada, and Parks Canada unveiled a commemorative plaque in 2017, at the Preston Auditorium to honour the Rivulettes. Ranscombe and her team were featured in the book Queens of the Ice by Carly Adams, and their story is the basis of the stage play Glory by Tracey Power.
