= Edmonton Rustlers =

The Edmonton Rustlers were a women's ice hockey team that competed during the Great Depression.

== Monarchs rivalry ==
In 1933, the Edmonton Monarchs suffered their first loss in four years at the hands of the newly formed Rustlers team. The members of the Rustlers were aged 15 to 18 years. During the entire year, the Rustlers were undefeated in regular season and post season play versus the Monarchs.

== Defeat of Preston ==
In winter 1933, Lady Bessborough, the wife of Governor General of Canada Lord Bessborough donated a championship trophy for the Dominion Women’s Amateur Hockey Association. The trophy would be contested between the Edmonton Rustlers and the Preston Rivulettes.

The success of the Edmonton Grads women's basketball team winning the National Basketball Championship in 1932 was essential to the Rustlers gaining support for the National Hockey title.

In the championship game, the Rivulettes were down by a score of 2-0. They came back to tie the game, but Hazel Case of the Rustlers scored the game-winning goal. In 1934, the Rivulettes were not able to raise the $1,800 to stage a rematch with the Rustlers.
