= Preston Rivulettes =

Canadian women's ice hockey team

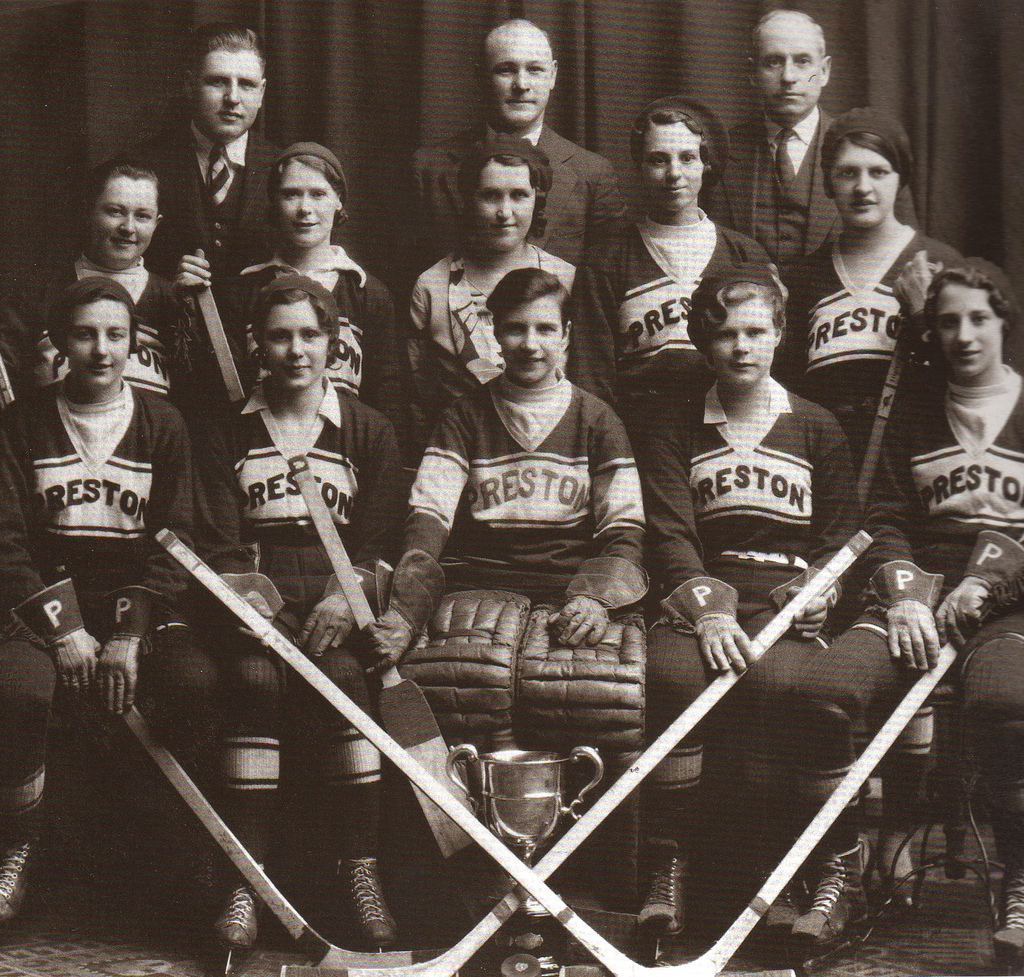
Preston Rivulettes team photo

The Preston Rivulettes were a Canadian women's ice hockey team. They won four Dominion Championships and ten Ontario titles between 1931 and 1940. The team had a winning percentage of over 95%, a record unmatched in the history of women's hockey. They were inducted into the Cambridge Sports Hall of Fame on May 2, 1998, as members of the inaugural class of 1997. They were awarded the Order of Sport in 2022, marking their induction into Canada's Sports Hall of Fame.

== Early history ==
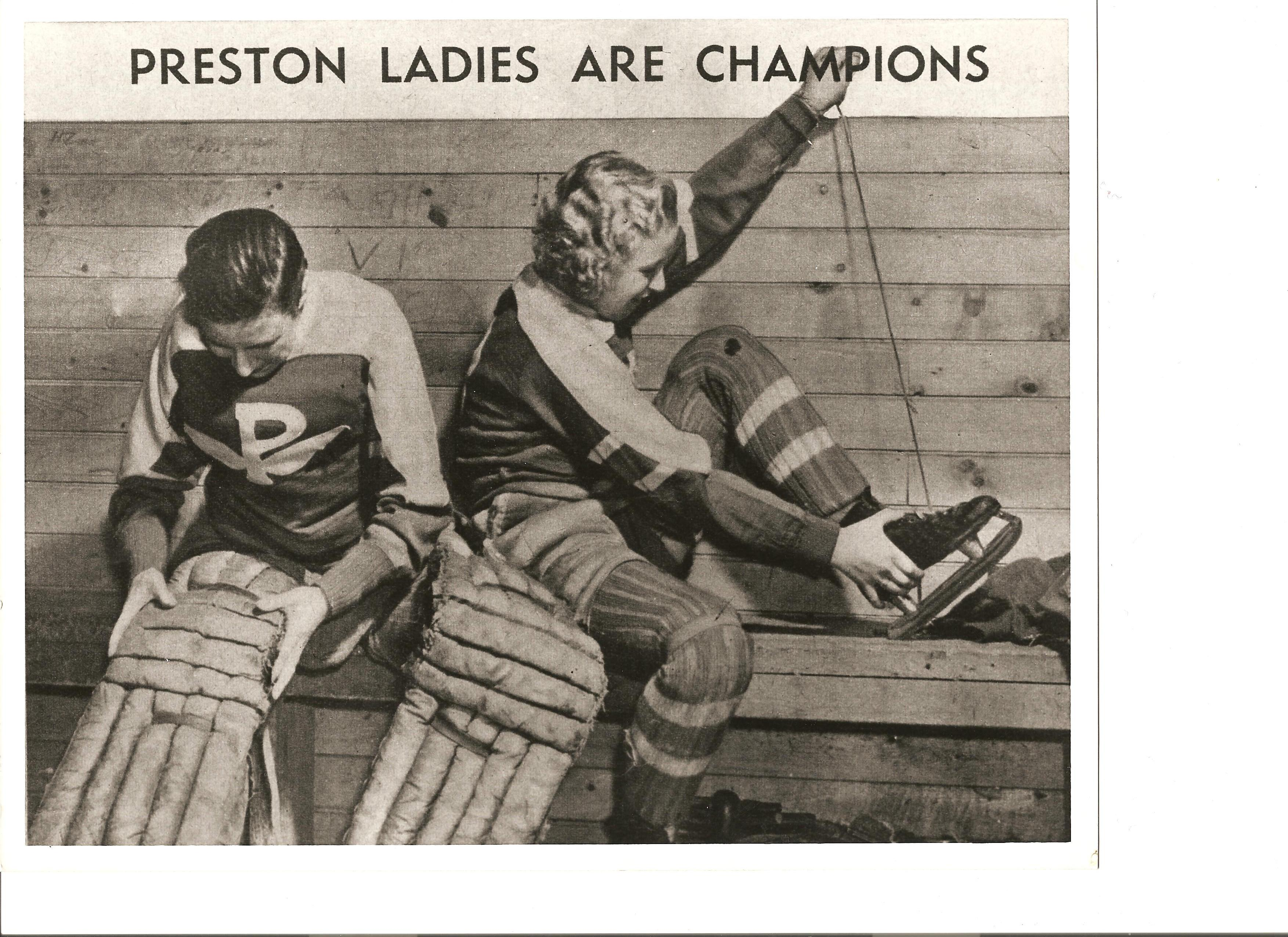
Preston Rivulettes post card Ruth Dargel on right; Nellie Ranscombe on left

Hilda and Nellie Ranscombe, and Marm and Helen Schmuck, played softball together during the summer of 1930 on a team called the Preston Rivulettes. They were looking for a winter sport to play and decided to form a hockey team. They reached out to prominent sports journalist Alexandrine Gibb for assistance. In January 1931, the team held its first practice with ten players:

- Nellie Ranscombe (goalie)
- Grace Webb (defence)
- Margaret Gabbitas (defence)
- Helen Schmuck (forward)
- Hilda Ranscombe (forward)
- Marm Schmuck (forward)
- Myrtle Parr (alternate)
- Pat Marriott (alternate)
- W. Makcrow (alternate)
- S. Leahy (alternate)

The manager of Preston's Lowther Street Arena, Herb Fach, coached the team with Roy Osgood as their manager. Team chaperones were Molly Hanlon and Beatrice Collard. In 1932, Marvin Dykeman joined as secretary/manager and Olive Dykeman as chaperone. Many of the original players remained on the team throughout the next decade, however, the Rivulettes welcomed new members throughout the 1930s, including, Dot Raffey, Helen Sault, Violet Hall, Ruth Dargel, Elvis Williams, Norma Hipel, Gladys Hawkins, and Marie Beilstein.

== Ladies Ontario Hockey Association ==
The Preston Rivulettes joined the Ladies Ontario Hockey Association (LOHA) in January 1931. Since league schedules were already fixed for the year, they could not play any regular season games. The LOHA allowed the Rivulettes to play a qualifying match against the Grimbsy Peaches to determine eligibility for the 1931 playoffs. After defeating the Peaches in a two-game series, the Rivulettes earned entry into the second round of the playoffs. The Rivulettes defeated the Port Dover Sailorettes in the LOHA quarterfinals, moving on to defeat London in the semi-finals, and Pembroke in the LOHA finals. The Rivulettes were LOHA intermediate champions in their first season.

The Rivulettes played teams from Ontario cities such as Toronto, Kitchener, Stratford, London, Hamilton, Guelph and Port Dover. Between 1930 and 1940, the team played an estimated 350 games. They lost only two and tied three. For the entire decade of the 1930s, the Rivulettes won the Bobby Rosenfeld Trophy. The trophy was given to the Ontario champions. In addition, the Rivulettes were six-time winners of the Eastern Canadian championship and the Elmer Doust Cup.

	Ladies Ontario Hockey Association Senior Division Champions, 1923 - 1940
1923	Ottawa Alerts defeated North Toronto
1924	Ottawa Alerts
1925	Sudbury vs. Toronto Pats in Final
1926	No information available
1927	Ottawa Rowing Club defeated Toronto Pats
1928	No information available
1929	Toronto Pats defeated Ottawa
1930	Port Dover Sailorettes
1931	Preston Rivulettes defeated Pembroke*
1932	Preston Rivulettes defeated Chalk River
1933	Preston Rivulettes defeated Toronto Ladies
1934	Preston Rivulettes defeated Toronto Vagabonds
1935	Preston Rivulettes defeated Bracebridge
1936	Preston Rivulettes defeated Gravenhurst Muskokas
1937	Preston Rivulettes defeated Markdale
1938	Preston Rivulettes defeated Ottawa Rangers
1939	Preston Rivulettes defeated Ottawa Rangers
1940	Preston Rivulettes defeated Toronto Ladies

*In 1927, the Senior division title was not contested for, instead the Rivulettes were Intermediate Provincial champions. Lack of ice time forced the Toronto Silverwoods and the Ottawa Rowing Club to forgo the Senior title.

	Eastern Canadian Women's Hockey Championship, 1934 - 1940
1934	Preston Rivulettes defeated Montreal Maroons
1935	Preston Rivulettes defeated Summerside, P.E.I., Primrose A.C.
1936	Preston Rivulettes defeated Montreal Maroons
1937	Preston Rivulettes (Montreal Maroons defaulted)
1938	Preston Springs Rivulettes defeated Charlottetown Islanders
1939	Not played due to structure change. The Rivulettes defeated the Winnipeg Olympics in the semifinals to move on to the Dominion finals
1940	Not available

The Ladies Ontario Hockey Association disbanded in 1940 due to declining participation and resources during wartime, leaving Ontario with no organized leagues or provincial championships. Although men's sport also declined at this time, it saw a resurgence in the postwar period. This did not occur to the same extent for women's sports and the Preston Rivulettes did not reconvene after the war.

== Dominion Women's Amateur Hockey Association ==
The Dominion Women's Amateur Hockey Association (DWAHA) was founded in 1933. DWAHA oversaw a national playoff for the top women's hockey teams in Canada, called the Dominion Championship. Lady Bessborough, the wife of Governor General of Canada Lord Bessborough donated a championship trophy for the Dominion Women’s Amateur Hockey Association. For the inaugural series, the Ontario Champion Preston Rivulettes played the Western Champion Edmonton Rustlers. This was the first time Preston had played outside of Ontario, and since Edmonton had covered all expenses on the Rivulettes' behalf, they could easily afford it. The team departed from Preston on a Wednesday, with 200 fans cheering them off at the train station, and arrived in Edmonton on Saturday, five hours before game time. They played before a crowd of 2500 people. The Rivulettes found themselves down by a score of 2-0. They came back to tie the game, but Hazel Case of the Rustlers later scored the game-winning goal. The Rivulettes had lost their first game in three seasons. The Rustlers won the second game of the championship series by a score of 1-0 to earn the title of Dominion Champions. This was the first ever recognition of a Canadian women's hockey national championship team. Although not able to secure the championship, the Rivulettes received favourable media coverage in Preston and throughout Ontario. On the week following their defeat, the team was welcomed to the Provincial Legislature in Toronto for a congratulatory meeting with Premier Henry.

Preston was scheduled to return the favour of hosting the 1934 Edmonton championship team the following year, however, the Rivulettes were not able to raise the $1,800 to stage a rematch with the Rustlers. Because of this, the Rustlers remained Dominion Champions.

In 1935, the Rivulettes defeated the Montreal Maroons in the Eastern Canadian semifinals and the Summerside Primrose A.C. from P.E.I. in the finals to claim the Eastern Canadian Championship. The Western champion team, Winnipeg Eatons, travelled to Preston to face the Rivulettes. This was the first time a western team had made the journey east. The Rivulettes won a hard-fought two game series to claim their first ever Dominion Championship.

After a dominating performance in the Ontario league in 1936, the Rivulettes travelled to the Montreal Forum to face the Maroons for the Eastern Canadian Championship. To keep costs down, the Rivulettes sent only eight players to the Eastern finals. After solidly beating Montreal 9-2, the Rivulettes achievements were reported on the sports page of the New York Times. The 1936 Dominion series was to take place in Winnipeg and the Rivulettes were facing financial challenges after the costs of travelling to Montreal. The DWAHA changed the rules which had previously guaranteed money for the visiting team and the Rivulettes were unable to work out a financial deal with Winnipeg. With Preston unable to cover their own travel expenses, they forfeited the Lady Bessborough Trophy to Winnipeg.

The Rivulettes won the Lady Bessborough trophy as Dominion Champions on home ice in Preston in 1937 and 1938. In 1939 they won the Championship in Charlottetown, P.E.I.

In 1940, the Rivulettes and the Winnipeg Olympics were unable to reach an agreement to guarantee travel expenses to a national championship series. When the Winnipeg Olympics declined to accept the Lady Bessborough Trophy by default of the Rivulettes not travelling west, DWAHA president Mary Dunn declared the title undecided and no team was awarded the trophy.

	Dominion Women's Hockey Championship, 1933 - 1940
1933	Edmonton Rustlers defeated Preston Rivulettes
1934	Not contested (Preston Rivulettes defaulted against Edmonton Rustlers)
1935	Preston Rivulettes defeated Winnipeg Eatons
1936	Not contested (Preston Rivulettes defaulted against the Winnipeg Olympics)
1937	Preston Rivulettes defeated Winnipeg Eatons
1938	Preston Springs Rivulettes defeated Winnipeg Olympics
1939	Preston Rivulettes defeated Winnipeg Olympics and Charlottetown Islanders
1940	Not contested (Preston Rivulettes and Winnipeg Olympics both defaulted)

== Ontario dominance ==
Although their early success served to promote women’s hockey, by 1938, their continued success proved to be an organizational challenge to the LOHA governing body. From 1931 to 1935, the Rivulettes were undefeated and had won five consecutive provincial championships. Many teams in Ontario did not want to join the LOHA because they felt they had no chance of winning. The Rivulettes success caused the number of member teams to decrease. The LOHA decided to create an A League and a B League, with the B League being for first year and less skilled teams. LOHA president Bobbie Rosenfeld found it to be the only way to increase the number of member teams.

== Financial difficulties and gender discrimination ==
Most members of the Preston Rivulettes worked full-time jobs or attended school during the 1930s. Coveted evening ice times were especially difficult to obtain for a women's team, leaving them left to practice at odd hours or whenever they were able. In March 1938, the LOHA semi-final between the Preston Rivulettes and the Northern Marvels of Cobalt had to be rescheduled. The game was set to be played in Preston, however the Ontario Hockey Association (men’s hockey association) forced a change in venue so that a men’s game could be played. Even though the Rivulettes often drew larger crowds than the Preston men's teams, they were often forced to make last minute scheduling changes because the men's play-off series took precedence.

Financial difficulties strained women's hockey teams throughout the country during the Depression. In 1937, the Alberta Provincial champion Calgary Grills were barred from the DWAHA for not paying their $10 membership fee.

== Legacy ==
The Rivulettes were inducted into the Cambridge Sports Hall of Fame on May 2, 1998, as members of the inaugural class of 1997.

Hilda Ranscombe was team captain of the Preston Rivulettes for the duration of their existence. In 1999, her name was submitted to the Hockey Hall of Fame for induction consideration, however, women were not inducted until 2010.

The formation of the Preston Rivulettes was named a National Historic Event on February 15, 2016. A federal historical marker reflecting that to be unveiled in Cambridge, Ontario, on December 22, 2017.

Ranscombe was inducted into Canada's Sports Hall of Fame as an individual athlete in 2015. The Rivulettes were awarded the Order of Sport in 2022, inducting the team into Canada's Sports Hall of Fame.

=== Theatre ===
Playwright Tracey Power wrote and choreographed an adaption of the Rivulettes' story. Titled Glory, it premiered on February 22, 2018, at the Western Canada Theatre in Kamloops, British Columbia. Power won the 2018 Betty Award for Best New Play. The play was later performed in Calgary, and has toured Western Canada, including to the Chemainus Theatre Festival.

== Sources ==
- Coast to Coast:Hockey in Canada to the Second World War, Edited by John Chi-Kit Wong, University of Toronto Press, 2009, ISBN 978-0-8020-9532-9
