= Climate of Edmonton =

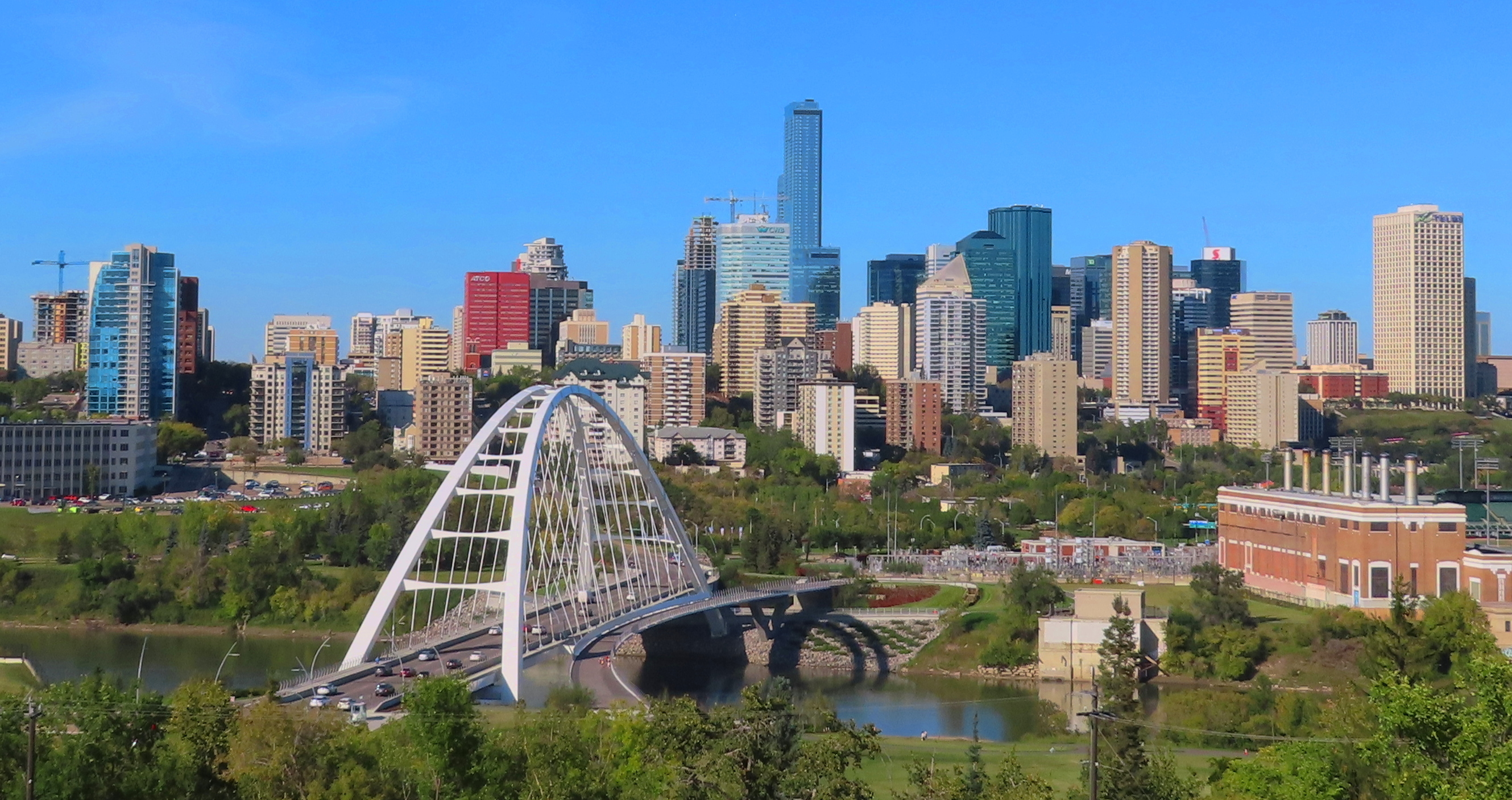
Summers in Edmonton are comfortable, with long sunny days and short nights.

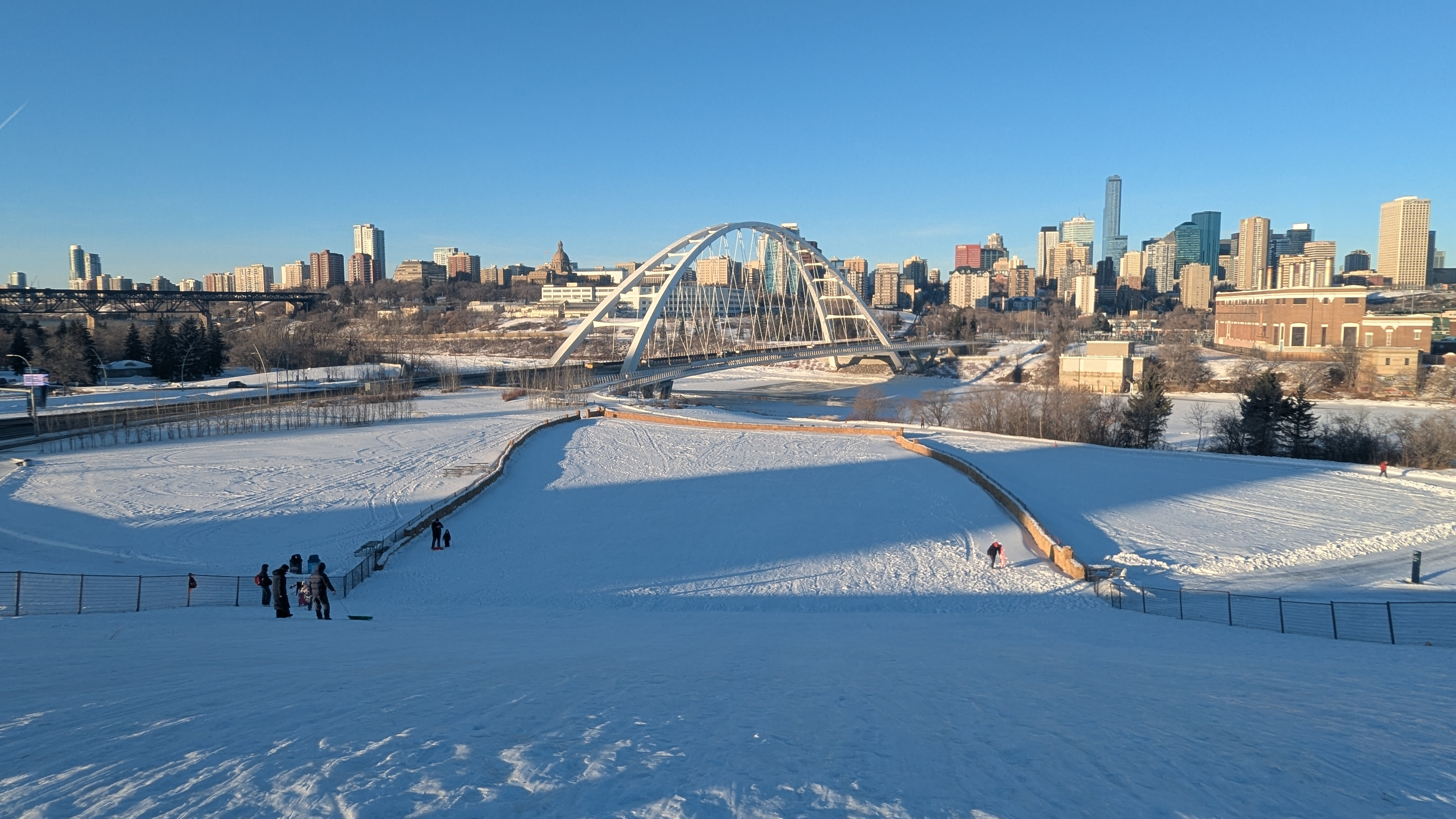
Winters in Edmonton are typically cold and dry.

Edmonton has a humid continental climate (Köppen climate classification Dfb). It falls into the NRC 4a Plant Hardiness Zone.

The city is known for having cold but sunny winters. Its average daily temperatures range from a low of −10.3 °C (13.5 °F) in January to a summer peak of 18.1 °C (64.6 °F) in July. The average maximum is 23.5 °C (74.3 °F) in July, and the average minimum is −14.7 °C (5.5 °F) in January. Temperatures can exceed 30.0 °C (86.0 °F) for an average of four to five days anytime from late April to mid-September and fall below −20.0 °C (−4.0 °F) for an average of 24.6 days. On June 30, 2021, at approximately 5:00 pm Edmonton South Campus reached a temperature of 37.4 °C (99.3 °F). This surpasses the previous 37.2 °C (99.0 °F) set on June 29, 1937. On July 2, 2013, a record high humidex of 44 was recorded, due to an unusually humid day with a temperature of 33.9 °C (93.0 °F). The lowest overall temperature ever recorded in Edmonton was −49.4 °C (−56.9 °F), on January 19 and 21, 1886 and February 3, 1893.

Summer lasts from late June until early September, and the humidity is seldom uncomfortably high. Winter lasts from November to March and in common with all of Alberta varies greatly in length and severity. Spring and autumn are both short and highly variable. Edmonton's growing season is from May 9 to September 22; Edmonton averages 135–140 frost-free days a year. At the summer solstice, Edmonton receives 17 hours and three minutes of daylight, with an hour and 46 minutes of civil twilight. On average Edmonton receives 2,299 hours of bright sunshine per year and is one of Canada's sunniest cities.

The summer of 2006 was a particularly hot one for Edmonton, as temperatures reached 29 °C (84 °F) or higher more than 20 times from mid-May to early September.

Edmonton's geography is also capable of producing summers where temperatures do not exceed 29.0 °C (84.2 °F). In Edmonton City Centre, the summer of 1916 had the lowest yearly maximum temperature of 27.2 °C (81.0 °F), and most recently in summer 1999 with a yearly maximum temperature of 28.8 °C (83.8 °F). Edmonton International Airport saw its lowest yearly maximum temperature at 28.3 °C (82.9 °F) in the summer of 1974. Summer 1980 and 1993 saw no daily minimum above 12.8 °C (55.0 °F) at Edmonton International Airport. The lowest yearly maximum daily minimum at Edmonton City Centre is 13.3 °C (55.9 °F), which was set and tied 5 times between 1883 and the last instance set in 1907. Summer 1992 also saw no dew point above 16.5 °C (61.7 °F) in Edmonton International Airport and 15.4 °C (59.7 °F) in Edmonton City Centre.

The winter of 2011–12 was particularly gentle. From December 22, 2011, till March 20, 2012, on 53 occasions Edmonton saw temperatures at or above 0.0 °C (32.0 °F) at the City Centre Airport.

The winter of 1969 was particularly cold. Between January 7 and February 1, temperatures at Edmonton's Industrial Airport reached daily highs of −6 °F (−21.1 °C) on two occasions and lows ranged from −14 °F (−25.6 °C) to −39 °F (−39.4 °C). The city's daily newspaper, Edmonton Journal, issued certificates for residents who lived through 'Edmonton's record cold spell'.

Edmonton has a fairly dry climate. On average, it receives 476.9 millimetres (18.78 in) of precipitation, of which 365.7 millimetres (14.40 in) is rain and 111.2 millimetres (4.38 in) is the melt from 123.5 centimetres (48.6 in) of snowfall per annum. Precipitation is heaviest in the late spring, summer, and early autumn. The wettest month is July, while the driest months are February, March, October, and November. In July the mean precipitation is 91.7 mm (3.61 in). Dry spells are not uncommon and may occur at any time of the year. Extremes do occur, such as the 114 mm (4.49 in) of rainfall that fell on July 31, 1953. Summer thunderstorms can be frequent and occasionally severe enough to produce large hail, damaging winds, funnel clouds, and occasionally tornadoes.

Twelve tornadoes had been recorded in Edmonton between 1890 and 1989, and eight since 1990. A F4 tornado that struck Edmonton on July 31, 1987, killing 27, was unusual in many respects, including severity, duration, damage, and casualties. It is commonly referred to as Black Friday due both to its aberrant characteristics and the emotional shock it generated. Then-mayor Laurence Decore cited the community's response to the tornado as evidence that Edmonton was a "city of champions," which later became an unofficial slogan of the city.

A massive cluster of thunderstorms occurred on July 11, 2004, with large hail and over 100 mm (4 in) of rain reported within the space of an hour in many places. This "1-in-200 year event" flooded major intersections and underpasses and damaged both residential and commercial properties. The storm caused extensive damage to West Edmonton Mall; a small glass section of the roof collapsed under the weight of the rainwater, causing water to drain onto the mall's indoor ice rink. As a result, the mall was evacuated as a precautionary measure.

== Classification ==
Edmonton Climate according to major climate systems
Climatic scheme	Initials	Description
Köppen system	Dfb	Warm-summer humid continental climate
Trewartha system	Dcb	Continental climate

== Data ==
City Centre/Blatchford maximum records:

- Record high temperature of 37.2 °C (99.0 °F) recorded on June 29, 1937
- Record high daily minimum of 23.4 °C (74.1 °F) recorded on July 1, 2021
- Record high dew point of 22.8 °C (73.0 °F) recorded on July 2, 2013
- Most humid month with an average monthly dew point of 13.4 °C (56.1 °F) recorded during July 2012
- Warmest month with an average monthly mean temperature of 22.0 °C (71.6 °F) recorded during July 2024
  - Warmest monthly average daily maximum of 27.9 °C (82.2 °F) recorded during July 2024
  - Warmest monthly average daily minimum of 16.2 °C (61.2 °F) recorded during July 2024
  - July 2024 saw no temperature below 10.5 °C (50.9 °F)
  - July 1936 saw no daily maximum temperature below 21.7 °C (71.1 °F)
  - July 2004 saw no dew point below 6.7 °C (44.1 °F)

YEG International Airport maximum records:

- Record high temperature of 35.6 °C (96.1 °F) recorded on August 18, 2008
- Record high daily minimum of 20.0 °C (68.0 °F) recorded on June 30, 2021
- Record high dew point of 25.3 °C (77.5 °F) recorded on July 2, 2013
- Most humid month with an average monthly dew point of 13.8 °C (56.8 °F) recorded during July 2012
- Warmest month with an average monthly mean temperature of 19.2 °C (66.6 °F) recorded during July 2024
  - Warmest monthly average daily maximum of 26.5 °C (79.7 °F) recorded during July 2024
  - Warmest monthly average daily minimum of 11.2 °C (52.2 °F) recorded during August 1991
  - August 1991 saw no daily maximum temperature below 19.5 °C (67.1 °F)
  - July 1994 saw no temperature below 7.3 °C (45.1 °F)
  - July 1997 saw no dew point below 5.8 °C (42.4 °F)

=== Recent data ===
The average yearly maximum daily minimum temperature is 17.7 °C (63.9 °F) in Edmonton City Centre and 15.1 °C (59.2 °F) at Edmonton International Airport. The average yearly maximum dew point is 18.6 °C (65.5 °F) in Edmonton City Centre and 19.6 °C (67.3 °F) at Edmonton International Airport.

Edmonton City Centre

Climate chart (precipitation, max. and min. temperature)
J	F	M	A	M	J	J	A	S	O	N	D
20 −6 −15	12 −3 −13	17 2 −8	29 10 −1	44 18 6	70 21 10	83 24 13	61 23 11	39 18 6	21 10 0	18 1 −8	12 −5 −13
- █ Average max. and min. temperatures in °C
- █ Precipitation totals in mm
- Source: Environment Canada
Imperial conversion
J	F	M	A	M	J	J	A	S	O	N	D
0.8 22 6	0.5 27 9	0.7 35 18	1.1 51 31	1.7 64 42	2.8 70 50	3.3 74 55	2.4 73 52	1.5 64 43	0.8 50 32	0.7 33 19	0.5 24 8
- █ Average max. and min. temperatures in °F
- █ Precipitation totals in inches

Climate data for Edmonton (Edmonton City Centre Airport). Climate ID: 3012208; coordinates 53°34′24″N 113°31′06″W; elevation: 670.6 m (2,200 ft); 1991–2020 normals, extremes 1880–present
Month	Jan	Feb	Mar	Apr	May	Jun	Jul	Aug	Sep	Oct	Nov	Dec	Year
Record high humidex	11.0	16.1	23.5	29.2	33.4	35.9	44.0	39.6	34.1	28.3	19.4	16.0	44.0
Record high °C (°F)	13.9 (57.0)	16.7 (62.1)	23.9 (75.0)	32.2 (90.0)	34.4 (93.9)	37.2 (99.0)	36.7 (98.1)	35.6 (96.1)	33.9 (93.0)	28.6 (83.5)	23.3 (73.9)	16.7 (62.1)	37.2 (99.0)
Mean maximum °C (°F)	7.8 (46.0)	8.7 (47.7)	13.0 (55.4)	22.2 (72.0)	27.7 (81.9)	28.5 (83.3)	30.6 (87.1)	30.5 (86.9)	27.4 (81.3)	21.5 (70.7)	11.6 (52.9)	7.1 (44.8)	32.2 (90.0)
Mean daily maximum °C (°F)	−5.8 (21.6)	−3.0 (26.6)	1.7 (35.1)	10.4 (50.7)	17.5 (63.5)	21.0 (69.8)	23.5 (74.3)	22.6 (72.7)	17.6 (63.7)	10.0 (50.0)	0.6 (33.1)	−4.7 (23.5)	9.3 (48.7)
Daily mean °C (°F)	−10.3 (13.5)	−7.9 (17.8)	−3.1 (26.4)	4.9 (40.8)	11.6 (52.9)	15.6 (60.1)	18.1 (64.6)	17.0 (62.6)	11.9 (53.4)	5.0 (41.0)	−3.5 (25.7)	−9.0 (15.8)	4.2 (39.6)
Mean daily minimum °C (°F)	−14.7 (5.5)	−12.7 (9.1)	−7.8 (18.0)	−0.7 (30.7)	5.6 (42.1)	10.2 (50.4)	12.6 (54.7)	11.3 (52.3)	6.2 (43.2)	−0.1 (31.8)	−7.5 (18.5)	−13.2 (8.2)	−0.9 (30.4)
Mean minimum °C (°F)	−29.2 (−20.6)	−24.7 (−12.5)	−21.7 (−7.1)	−9.7 (14.5)	−1.6 (29.1)	4.8 (40.6)	7.8 (46.0)	5.4 (41.7)	−0.7 (30.7)	−8.7 (16.3)	−19.0 (−2.2)	−24.9 (−12.8)	−31.9 (−25.4)
Record low °C (°F)	−49.4 (−56.9)	−49.4 (−56.9)	−40.0 (−40.0)	−26.1 (−15.0)	−12.2 (10.0)	−3.9 (25.0)	−1.7 (28.9)	−3.3 (26.1)	−11.7 (10.9)	−26.1 (−15.0)	−42.2 (−44.0)	−48.3 (−54.9)	−49.4 (−56.9)
Record low wind chill	−52.8	−50.7	−44.6	−37.5	−14.5	0.0	0.0	−3.7	−13.3	−34.3	−50.2	−55.5	−55.5
Average precipitation mm (inches)	19.6 (0.77)	11.8 (0.46)	16.8 (0.66)	28.6 (1.13)	44.2 (1.74)	69.9 (2.75)	82.7 (3.26)	60.7 (2.39)	38.5 (1.52)	20.5 (0.81)	17.5 (0.69)	11.8 (0.46)	422.5 (16.63)
Average rainfall mm (inches)	0.9 (0.04)	0.6 (0.02)	1.9 (0.07)	15.8 (0.62)	43.9 (1.73)	69.9 (2.75)	78.2 (3.08)	66.6 (2.62)	38.4 (1.51)	11.4 (0.45)	1.3 (0.05)	0.6 (0.02)	329.3 (12.96)
Average snowfall cm (inches)	25.6 (10.1)	12.7 (5.0)	19.1 (7.5)	15.0 (5.9)	4.9 (1.9)	0.0 (0.0)	0.0 (0.0)	0.1 (0.0)	0.7 (0.3)	11.0 (4.3)	19.8 (7.8)	15.1 (5.9)	123.9 (48.8)
Average precipitation days (≥ 0.2 mm)	11.2	8.0	8.1	8.9	10.2	14.4	15.1	12.2	10.6	8.7	8.8	8.3	124.4
Average rainy days (≥ 0.2 mm)	1.1	0.82	1.4	6.7	11.0	14.7	15.1	12.1	10.4	6.8	1.6	0.75	82.4
Average snowy days (≥ 0.2 cm)	10.6	6.9	7.5	4.1	1.1	0.0	0.0	0.06	0.29	2.9	7.2	8.4	49.0
Average relative humidity (%) (at 1500 LST)	65.2	59.5	53.9	43.5	39.3	47.8	50.6	49.3	48.2	51.0	63.8	65.4	53.1
Average dew point °C (°F)	−14.1 (6.6)	−12.5 (9.5)	−8.8 (16.2)	−3.6 (25.5)	1.4 (34.5)	7.7 (45.9)	11.1 (52.0)	10.1 (50.2)	5.0 (41.0)	−1.5 (29.3)	−7.6 (18.3)	−12.9 (8.8)	−2.1 (28.2)
Mean monthly sunshine hours	100.8	121.7	176.3	244.2	279.9	285.9	307.5	282.3	192.7	170.8	98.4	84.5	2,344.8
Mean daily sunshine hours	3.3	4.3	5.7	8.1	9.0	9.5	9.9	9.1	6.4	5.5	3.3	2.7	6.4
Percentage possible sunshine	40.2	44.1	48.1	58.2	56.8	56.2	60.2	61.5	50.4	52.0	37.8	36.0	50.1
Average ultraviolet index	0.0	1.0	2.0	4.0	5.0	6.0	6.0	5.0	4.0	2.0	1.0	0.0	3.0
Source 1: Environment and Climate Change Canada (sun, UV 1981–2010), (July record high humidex), Extremes (1880–1943); Note: climate data was collected near downtown Edmonton from July 1880 to June 1943, and at Edmonton City Centre Airport (Blatchford Field) from October 1937 to present.
Source 2: weatherstats.ca (for dewpoint and monthly&yearly average absolute maximum&minimum temperature)

Leduc/Edmonton International Airport

Climate chart (precipitation, max. and min. temperature)
J	F	M	A	M	J	J	A	S	O	N	D
22 −7 −18	12 −4 −17	17 1 −11	30 10 −3	47 18 3	75 21 8	87 23 9	53 22 8	35 18 3	22 10 −3	20 0 −11	15 −5 −17
- █ Average max. and min. temperatures in °C
- █ Precipitation totals in mm
- Source: Environment Canada
Imperial conversion
J	F	M	A	M	J	J	A	S	O	N	D
0.8 20 −1	0.5 25 2	0.7 33 12	1.2 50 26	1.9 64 37	2.9 69 46	3.4 73 49	2.1 72 46	1.4 64 37	0.9 50 26	0.8 32 13	0.6 22 2
- █ Average max. and min. temperatures in °F
- █ Precipitation totals in inches

Climate data for Leduc-Edmonton (Edmonton International Airport) WMO ID: 71123; coordinates 53°19′N 113°35′W; elevation: 723.3 m (2,373 ft); 1991–2020 normals, extremes 1959–2020
Month	Jan	Feb	Mar	Apr	May	Jun	Jul	Aug	Sep	Oct	Nov	Dec	Year
Record high humidex	9.2	12.8	23.5	30.0	33.6	37.3	44.0	38.7	33.9	28.4	20.8	14.6	44.0
Record high °C (°F)	9.9 (49.8)	13.3 (55.9)	24.2 (75.6)	30.5 (86.9)	32.8 (91.0)	34.4 (93.9)	35.0 (95.0)	35.6 (96.1)	34.9 (94.8)	29.1 (84.4)	18.8 (65.8)	15.9 (60.6)	35.6 (96.1)
Mean maximum °C (°F)	7.0 (44.6)	6.8 (44.2)	11.3 (52.3)	22.2 (72.0)	28.0 (82.4)	28.1 (82.6)	29.5 (85.1)	29.8 (85.6)	27.7 (81.9)	21.5 (70.7)	11.1 (52.0)	6.3 (43.3)	31.5 (88.7)
Mean daily maximum °C (°F)	−6.5 (20.3)	−4.1 (24.6)	0.5 (32.9)	10.1 (50.2)	17.6 (63.7)	20.7 (69.3)	23.0 (73.4)	22.4 (72.3)	17.8 (64.0)	10.0 (50.0)	0.2 (32.4)	−5.3 (22.5)	8.9 (48.0)
Daily mean °C (°F)	−12.3 (9.9)	−10.4 (13.3)	−5.3 (22.5)	3.5 (38.3)	10.1 (50.2)	14.1 (57.4)	16.2 (61.2)	15.1 (59.2)	10.3 (50.5)	3.4 (38.1)	−5.2 (22.6)	−11.0 (12.2)	2.4 (36.3)
Mean daily minimum °C (°F)	−18.1 (−0.6)	−16.6 (2.1)	−11.2 (11.8)	−3.2 (26.2)	2.7 (36.9)	7.5 (45.5)	9.4 (48.9)	7.8 (46.0)	2.8 (37.0)	−3.3 (26.1)	−10.6 (12.9)	−16.7 (1.9)	−4.1 (24.6)
Mean minimum °C (°F)	−35.0 (−31.0)	−30.5 (−22.9)	−28.3 (−18.9)	−13.1 (8.4)	−5.3 (22.5)	1.4 (34.5)	3.7 (38.7)	1.4 (34.5)	−4.4 (24.1)	−12.9 (8.8)	−24.2 (−11.6)	−30.0 (−22.0)	−38.5 (−37.3)
Record low °C (°F)	−48.3 (−54.9)	−43.9 (−47.0)	−42.7 (−44.9)	−28.3 (−18.9)	−11.6 (11.1)	−6.1 (21.0)	−1.0 (30.2)	−3.8 (25.2)	−9.6 (14.7)	−26.5 (−15.7)	−36.4 (−33.5)	−46.1 (−51.0)	−48.3 (−54.9)
Record low wind chill	−61.1	−53.5	−50.7	−33.7	−16.3	−7.3	−3.9	−5.8	−14.3	−34.9	−51.5	−58.3	−61.1
Average precipitation mm (inches)	21.5 (0.85)	12.4 (0.49)	17.3 (0.68)	29.8 (1.17)	47.0 (1.85)	74.7 (2.94)	87.2 (3.43)	52.6 (2.07)	34.7 (1.37)	22.3 (0.88)	20.0 (0.79)	14.6 (0.57)	434.0 (17.09)
Average rainfall mm (inches)	1.1 (0.04)	0.5 (0.02)	0.8 (0.03)	14.9 (0.59)	41.6 (1.64)	75.2 (2.96)	88.0 (3.46)	53.2 (2.09)	34.5 (1.36)	12.4 (0.49)	1.5 (0.06)	0.5 (0.02)	324.1 (12.76)
Average snowfall cm (inches)	24.2 (9.5)	14.4 (5.7)	19.2 (7.6)	16.3 (6.4)	6.4 (2.5)	0.1 (0.0)	0.0 (0.0)	0.1 (0.0)	0.6 (0.2)	10.1 (4.0)	19.1 (7.5)	16.3 (6.4)	126.7 (49.9)
Average precipitation days (≥ 0.2 mm)	10.9	8.2	9.8	8.9	11.4	14.7	16.2	12.1	10.5	10.2	10.1	9.8	132.8
Average rainy days (≥ 0.2 mm)	1.0	0.6	1.0	5.9	10.3	14.4	15.5	11.9	9.5	6.1	1.7	0.4	78.3
Average snowy days (≥ 0.2 cm)	10.7	8.5	8.5	4.4	1.8	0.04	0.0	0.04	0.29	3.4	7.7	9.3	54.7
Average relative humidity (%) (at 1500 LST)	69.7	66.7	62.8	46.9	40.1	49.9	54.5	51.9	48.4	52.3	67.9	70.2	56.8
Average dew point °C (°F)	−15.7 (3.7)	−13.9 (7.0)	−9.3 (15.3)	−3.5 (25.7)	1.1 (34.0)	7.6 (45.7)	11.2 (52.2)	10.0 (50.0)	4.3 (39.7)	−2.1 (28.2)	−8.6 (16.5)	−14.3 (6.3)	−2.8 (27.0)
Mean monthly sunshine hours	101.1	127.0	174.7	233.3	271.0	275.9	302.2	279.4	196.1	160.4	97.2	92.0	2,310.3
Percentage possible sunshine	40.1	45.9	47.6	55.7	55.1	54.4	59.3	61.0	51.3	48.7	37.3	39.0	49.6
Source 1: Environment and Climate Change Canada
Source 2: weatherstats.ca (for dewpoint and monthly/yearly average absolute maximum/minimum temperature)

=== Old data ===
==== 1981-2010 ====
Climate data for Woodbend (Devon-Edmonton, Devonian Botanic Garden), Climate ID: 3012230; coordinates 53°25′N 113°45′W; elevation: 670.6 m (2,200 ft); 1981–2010 normals, extremes 1973–2007
Month	Jan	Feb	Mar	Apr	May	Jun	Jul	Aug	Sep	Oct	Nov	Dec	Year
Record high °C (°F)	13.0 (55.4)	16.0 (60.8)	24.0 (75.2)	30.6 (87.1)	33.5 (92.3)	35.0 (95.0)	35.5 (95.9)	35.0 (95.0)	35.0 (95.0)	30.5 (86.9)	20.0 (68.0)	15.0 (59.0)	35.5 (95.9)
Mean daily maximum °C (°F)	−5.4 (22.3)	−2.4 (27.7)	2.9 (37.2)	11.8 (53.2)	18.1 (64.6)	21.3 (70.3)	23.5 (74.3)	22.4 (72.3)	17.2 (63.0)	10.5 (50.9)	0.0 (32.0)	−4.1 (24.6)	9.7 (49.4)
Daily mean °C (°F)	−11.1 (12.0)	−8.6 (16.5)	−3.3 (26.1)	4.7 (40.5)	10.4 (50.7)	14.1 (57.4)	16.4 (61.5)	15.2 (59.4)	10.1 (50.2)	4.2 (39.6)	−4.9 (23.2)	−9.7 (14.5)	3.1 (37.6)
Mean daily minimum °C (°F)	−16.7 (1.9)	−14.8 (5.4)	−9.5 (14.9)	−2.4 (27.7)	2.7 (36.9)	6.9 (44.4)	9.3 (48.7)	8.0 (46.4)	2.9 (37.2)	−2.2 (28.0)	−9.9 (14.2)	−15.2 (4.6)	−3.4 (25.9)
Record low °C (°F)	−45.0 (−49.0)	−45.0 (−49.0)	−40.0 (−40.0)	−30.0 (−22.0)	−10.0 (14.0)	−2.5 (27.5)	1.0 (33.8)	−4.0 (24.8)	−10.0 (14.0)	−25.0 (−13.0)	−35.0 (−31.0)	−46.0 (−50.8)	−46.0 (−50.8)
Average precipitation mm (inches)	24.8 (0.98)	14.3 (0.56)	22.2 (0.87)	27.3 (1.07)	52.3 (2.06)	84.5 (3.33)	102.7 (4.04)	67.0 (2.64)	49.5 (1.95)	25.6 (1.01)	22.5 (0.89)	15.3 (0.60)	508 (20)
Average rainfall mm (inches)	1.2 (0.05)	0.3 (0.01)	1.5 (0.06)	16.2 (0.64)	47.5 (1.87)	84.5 (3.33)	102.7 (4.04)	66.7 (2.63)	48.6 (1.91)	14.6 (0.57)	1.7 (0.07)	0.7 (0.03)	386.2 (15.21)
Average snowfall cm (inches)	23.6 (9.3)	14.1 (5.6)	20.6 (8.1)	11.1 (4.4)	4.8 (1.9)	0.0 (0.0)	0.0 (0.0)	0.3 (0.1)	0.9 (0.4)	11.0 (4.3)	20.8 (8.2)	14.5 (5.7)	121.7 (48)
Average precipitation days (≥ 0.2 mm)	9.1	6.9	7.6	7.0	10.3	14.7	15.2	12.4	10.3	7.4	8.1	7.1	116.1
Average rainy days (≥ 0.2 mm)	0.67	0.23	1.1	4.6	10.1	14.7	15.2	12.4	10.2	5.4	1.1	0.31	76.01
Average snowy days (≥ 0.2 cm)	8.5	6.7	6.6	2.9	0.56	0.0	0.0	0.04	0.26	2.4	7.1	6.9	41.96
Source: Environment and Climate Change Canada

==== 1971-2000 ====
Climate data for Namao (CFB Namao) WMO ID: 71121; coordinates 53°40′N 113°28′W; elevation: 687.9 m (2,257 ft); 1971–2000 normals
Month	Jan	Feb	Mar	Apr	May	Jun	Jul	Aug	Sep	Oct	Nov	Dec	Year
Record high humidex	9.8	13.0	16.1	28.9	34.9	38.4	37.8	41.5	36.2	27.8	18.9	12.8	41.5
Record high °C (°F)	10.0 (50.0)	13.9 (57.0)	16.3 (61.3)	29.6 (85.3)	31.9 (89.4)	33.9 (93.0)	33.9 (93.0)	33.9 (93.0)	32.8 (91.0)	28.4 (83.1)	18.9 (66.0)	10.6 (51.1)	33.9 (93.0)
Mean daily maximum °C (°F)	−7.6 (18.3)	−5.3 (22.5)	1.3 (34.3)	10.6 (51.1)	17.3 (63.1)	20.5 (68.9)	22.2 (72.0)	21.4 (70.5)	16.3 (61.3)	10.5 (50.9)	−0.6 (30.9)	−6.2 (20.8)	8.4 (47.1)
Daily mean °C (°F)	−12.1 (10.2)	−10.1 (13.8)	−3.5 (25.7)	4.8 (40.6)	11.1 (52.0)	14.7 (58.5)	16.5 (61.7)	15.6 (60.1)	10.5 (50.9)	4.9 (40.8)	−4.9 (23.2)	−10.6 (12.9)	3.1 (37.6)
Mean daily minimum °C (°F)	−16.6 (2.1)	−14.8 (5.4)	−8.2 (17.2)	−1.1 (30.0)	4.8 (40.6)	8.8 (47.8)	10.8 (51.4)	9.7 (49.5)	4.7 (40.5)	−0.7 (30.7)	−9.1 (15.6)	−15.0 (5.0)	−2.2 (28.0)
Record low °C (°F)	−42.2 (−44.0)	−38.0 (−36.4)	−35.0 (−31.0)	−23.3 (−9.9)	−7.2 (19.0)	−1.1 (30.0)	2.8 (37.0)	−2.0 (28.4)	−7.8 (18.0)	−24.5 (−12.1)	−35.4 (−31.7)	−39.2 (−38.6)	−42.2 (−44.0)
Record low wind chill	−57.1	−51.3	−45.9	−30.8	−14.2	−4.9	0.0	−4.6	−15.5	−35.4	−52.8	−56.4	−57.1
Average precipitation mm (inches)	19.7 (0.78)	14.0 (0.55)	17.3 (0.68)	20.2 (0.80)	44.7 (1.76)	88.6 (3.49)	95.7 (3.77)	74.8 (2.94)	39.6 (1.56)	16.4 (0.65)	14.3 (0.56)	21.0 (0.83)	466.3 (18.36)
Average rainfall mm (inches)	1.3 (0.05)	0.5 (0.02)	1.7 (0.07)	8.3 (0.33)	40.9 (1.61)	88.6 (3.49)	95.7 (3.77)	74.7 (2.94)	37.9 (1.49)	9.9 (0.39)	1.8 (0.07)	1.0 (0.04)	362.3 (14.26)
Average snowfall cm (inches)	21.7 (8.5)	17.2 (6.8)	17.3 (6.8)	13.0 (5.1)	3.6 (1.4)	0.0 (0.0)	0.0 (0.0)	0.2 (0.1)	1.8 (0.7)	7.0 (2.8)	15.4 (6.1)	23.7 (9.3)	120.9 (47.6)
Average precipitation days (≥ 0.2 mm)	10.2	8.4	7.8	6.7	10.4	15.1	14.3	13.1	10.0	6.6	7.8	10.2	120.4
Average rainy days (≥ 0.2 mm)	0.76	0.76	1.1	4.2	10.0	15.1	14.3	13.1	9.6	4.5	1.5	1.0	76.0
Average snowy days (≥ 0.2 cm)	10.3	8.4	7.1	3.8	0.84	0.0	0.0	0.08	0.92	2.9	7.1	10.2	51.7
Average relative humidity (%) (at 1500)	68.0	64.6	61.4	45.5	41.1	49.3	54.6	54.5	53.3	50.2	66.8	70.3	56.6
Source: Environment and Climate Change Canada

==== 1961-1990 ====
Climate data for Edmonton (Edmonton City Centre Airport). Climate ID: 3012208; coordinates 53°34′24″N 113°31′06″W; elevation: 670.6 m (2,200 ft); 1961–1990 normals, extremes 1937-1990
Month	Jan	Feb	Mar	Apr	May	Jun	Jul	Aug	Sep	Oct	Nov	Dec	Year
Record high °C (°F)	11.7 (53.1)	13.9 (57.0)	20.6 (69.1)	31.1 (88.0)	32.3 (90.1)	34.4 (93.9)	34.4 (93.9)	33.5 (92.3)	33.9 (93.0)	28.6 (83.5)	21.7 (71.1)	28.1 (82.6)	34.4 (93.9)
Mean maximum °C (°F)	6.7 (44.1)	8.2 (46.8)	11.7 (53.1)	21.9 (71.4)	27.3 (81.1)	29.7 (85.5)	30.7 (87.3)	29.9 (85.8)	26.3 (79.3)	22.8 (73.0)	11.7 (53.1)	6.3 (43.3)	32.1 (89.8)
Mean daily maximum °C (°F)	−8.2 (17.2)	−4.2 (24.4)	1.1 (34.0)	10.5 (50.9)	17.5 (63.5)	21.3 (70.3)	23.0 (73.4)	22.1 (71.8)	16.6 (61.9)	11.3 (52.3)	−0.1 (31.8)	−6.3 (20.7)	8.7 (47.7)
Daily mean °C (°F)	−12.5 (9.5)	−8.9 (16.0)	−3.6 (25.5)	4.9 (40.8)	11.6 (52.9)	15.6 (60.1)	17.5 (63.5)	16.6 (61.9)	11.1 (52.0)	5.9 (42.6)	−4.2 (24.4)	−10.5 (13.1)	3.6 (38.5)
Mean daily minimum °C (°F)	−17.0 (1.4)	−13.7 (7.3)	−8.4 (16.9)	−0.7 (30.7)	5.7 (42.3)	9.9 (49.8)	12.0 (53.6)	11.0 (51.8)	5.6 (42.1)	0.6 (33.1)	−8.4 (16.9)	−14.8 (5.4)	−1.5 (29.3)
Mean minimum °C (°F)	−30.8 (−23.4)	−26.3 (−15.3)	−20.7 (−5.3)	−10.0 (14.0)	−1.2 (29.8)	4.5 (40.1)	7.5 (45.5)	5.0 (41.0)	−0.9 (30.4)	−7.6 (18.3)	−21.2 (−6.2)	−28.9 (−20.0)	−33.9 (−29.0)
Record low °C (°F)	−44.4 (−47.9)	−46.1 (−51.0)	−36.1 (−33.0)	−25.6 (−14.1)	−12.2 (10.0)	−1.1 (30.0)	0.6 (33.1)	0.6 (33.1)	−11.7 (10.9)	−25.0 (−13.0)	−34.1 (−29.4)	−48.3 (−54.9)	−48.3 (−54.9)
Average precipitation mm (inches)	23.3 (0.92)	16.8 (0.66)	17.0 (0.67)	22.1 (0.87)	43.5 (1.71)	79.9 (3.15)	94.3 (3.71)	67.0 (2.64)	41.6 (1.64)	17.3 (0.68)	16.1 (0.63)	22.2 (0.87)	461.1 (18.15)
Average rainfall mm (inches)	2.0 (0.08)	0.8 (0.03)	2.0 (0.08)	9.9 (0.39)	40.5 (1.59)	79.8 (3.14)	94.3 (3.71)	67.0 (2.64)	39.9 (1.57)	10.0 (0.39)	2.2 (0.09)	0.9 (0.04)	349.3 (13.75)
Average snowfall cm (inches)	25.6 (10.1)	19.6 (7.7)	17.7 (7.0)	12.8 (5.0)	2.8 (1.1)	0.0 (0.0)	0.0 (0.0)	0.0 (0.0)	1.9 (0.7)	7.4 (2.9)	16.3 (6.4)	25.5 (10.0)	129.6 (50.9)
Average precipitation days (≥ 0.2 mm)	12	9	9	7	10	13	13	12	10	6	9	11	121
Average rainy days (≥ 0.2 mm)	1	trace	1	4	10	13	13	12	9	4	2	1	70
Average snowy days (≥ 0.2 cm)	12	9	9	4	trace	trace	0	0	trace	2	8	11	55
Average relative humidity (%)	73	72	71	58	53	60	66	68	69	64	74	75	67
Average dew point °C (°F)	−16.6 (2.1)	−13.4 (7.9)	−8.7 (16.3)	−3.7 (25.3)	1.2 (34.2)	6.8 (44.2)	10.2 (50.4)	9.7 (49.5)	4.6 (40.3)	−1.4 (29.5)	−8.9 (16.0)	−14.6 (5.7)	−2.9 (26.8)
Mean monthly sunshine hours	95.3	116.6	170.0	238.9	278.7	283.3	305.8	280.9	184.2	164.5	101.1	77.6	2,296.9
Mean daily sunshine hours	3.1	4.1	5.5	8.0	9.0	9.4	9.9	9.1	6.1	5.3	3.4	2.5	6.3
Percentage possible sunshine	38	42	46	57	57	56	60	61	48	50	39	33	49
Source 1: Environment and Climate Change Canada
Source 2: weatherstats.ca (for dewpoint and monthly&yearly average absolute maximum&minimum temperature)

Climate data for Leduc-Edmonton (Edmonton International Airport) WMO ID: 71123; coordinates 53°19′N 113°35′W; elevation: 723.3 m (2,373 ft); 1961–1990 normals, extremes 1959-1990 (Note: Not located within the City of Edmonton)
Month	Jan	Feb	Mar	Apr	May	Jun	Jul	Aug	Sep	Oct	Nov	Dec	Year
Record high °C (°F)	9.6 (49.3)	12.2 (54.0)	17.2 (63.0)	30.5 (86.9)	32.8 (91.0)	34.4 (93.9)	35.0 (95.0)	33.3 (91.9)	34.9 (94.8)	29.1 (84.4)	18.3 (64.9)	10.6 (51.1)	35.0 (95.0)
Mean maximum °C (°F)	5.8 (42.4)	6.8 (44.2)	10.1 (50.2)	22.0 (71.6)	27.2 (81.0)	29.0 (84.2)	29.9 (85.8)	29.2 (84.6)	26.4 (79.5)	23.3 (73.9)	11.9 (53.4)	5.5 (41.9)	31.6 (88.9)
Mean daily maximum °C (°F)	−8.7 (16.3)	−5.1 (22.8)	0.1 (32.2)	9.9 (49.8)	17.4 (63.3)	20.9 (69.6)	22.5 (72.5)	21.8 (71.2)	16.6 (61.9)	11.3 (52.3)	−0.4 (31.3)	−6.9 (19.6)	8.3 (46.9)
Daily mean °C (°F)	−14.2 (6.4)	−10.8 (12.6)	−5.4 (22.3)	3.7 (38.7)	10.3 (50.5)	14.2 (57.6)	16.0 (60.8)	15.0 (59.0)	9.9 (49.8)	4.6 (40.3)	−5.7 (21.7)	−12.2 (10.0)	2.1 (35.8)
Mean daily minimum °C (°F)	−19.8 (−3.6)	−16.7 (1.9)	−11.1 (12.0)	−2.7 (27.1)	3.2 (37.8)	7.4 (45.3)	9.4 (48.9)	8.2 (46.8)	3.2 (37.8)	−2.2 (28.0)	−11.1 (12.0)	−17.7 (0.1)	−4.2 (24.5)
Mean minimum °C (°F)	−34.9 (−30.8)	−30.9 (−23.6)	−25.8 (−14.4)	−12.8 (9.0)	−4.0 (24.8)	1.3 (34.3)	4.2 (39.6)	1.8 (35.2)	−3.6 (25.5)	−10.9 (12.4)	−25.4 (−13.7)	−33.8 (−28.8)	−38.7 (−37.7)
Record low °C (°F)	−48.3 (−54.9)	−43.3 (−45.9)	−42.2 (−44.0)	−28.3 (−18.9)	−11.1 (12.0)	−6.1 (21.0)	0.0 (32.0)	−1.4 (29.5)	−9.6 (14.7)	−26.5 (−15.7)	−35.6 (−32.1)	−44.5 (−48.1)	−48.3 (−54.9)
Average precipitation mm (inches)	22.9 (0.90)	15.5 (0.61)	15.9 (0.63)	21.8 (0.86)	42.8 (1.69)	76.1 (3.00)	101.0 (3.98)	69.5 (2.74)	47.5 (1.87)	17.7 (0.70)	16.0 (0.63)	19.2 (0.76)	465.9 (18.37)
Average rainfall mm (inches)	2.0 (0.08)	0.5 (0.02)	1.4 (0.06)	10.3 (0.41)	39.1 (1.54)	76.1 (3.00)	101.0 (3.98)	69.5 (2.74)	44.9 (1.77)	10.2 (0.40)	1.9 (0.07)	0.9 (0.04)	357.8 (14.11)
Average snowfall cm (inches)	25.7 (10.1)	18.5 (7.3)	17.7 (7.0)	12.2 (4.8)	3.6 (1.4)	0.0 (0.0)	0.0 (0.0)	0.0 (0.0)	2.5 (1.0)	7.8 (3.1)	16.7 (6.6)	22.4 (8.8)	127.1 (50.1)
Average precipitation days (≥ 0.2 mm)	11	9	10	7	10	13	14	12	10	6	9	11	122
Average rainy days (≥ 0.2 mm)	1	trace	1	4	10	13	14	12	10	5	1	trace	71
Average snowy days (≥ 0.2 cm)	11	9	9	5	trace	0	0	0	1	2	8	10	55
Average relative humidity (%)	73	73	74	64	57	65	73	74	73	69	76	74	70
Average dew point °C (°F)	−18.0 (−0.4)	−14.7 (5.5)	−9.5 (14.9)	−3.6 (25.5)	1.3 (34.3)	7.0 (44.6)	10.5 (50.9)	9.7 (49.5)	4.3 (39.7)	−1.7 (28.9)	−9.5 (14.9)	−15.8 (3.6)	−3.3 (26.1)
Mean monthly sunshine hours	98.6	118.5	168.1	237.1	278.6	286.4	307.8	280.5	186.1	164.0	98.5	79.2	2,303.4
Mean daily sunshine hours	3.2	4.2	5.4	7.9	9.0	9.5	9.9	9.0	6.2	5.3	3.3	2.6	6.3
Percentage possible sunshine	39	43	46	57	57	57	60	61	49	50	38	34	49
Source 1: Environment and Climate Change Canada
Source 2: weatherstats.ca (for dewpoint and monthly&yearly average absolute maximum&minimum temperature)

== Climate change ==
By 2018, 73% of the city's residents were concerned about climate change. In the same year, the city hosted the Intergovernmental Panel on Climate Change's (IPCC): Cities and Climate Change Science Conference. Edmonton has been working on àn energy efficiency plan for both civilian and business people. David Dodge, co-chair of its energy transition advisory committee, stated Edmonton currently emits 20 tonnes of carbon per person. There was also the financing for solar panels. US $3.2 billion would be the impact of climate change in Edmonton by 2050, at which point the city will experience approximately sixteen days per year with temperatures exceeding 30 °C and an average high of around 35 °C, resulting in more heat waves. The annual average temperature of 2.1 °C would rise to 5.6 °C or up to 8 °C by 2080, with no correction according to the Climate Resilient report Edmonton: Adaptation Strategy and Action Plan. Storms, gusts of wind and freezing rain would be more frequent and cause more damage.
