= Ladies Ontario Hockey Association =

- Sport: Ice hockey
- Founded: 1922
- No. of teams: 18 (1922)
- Country: Canada

The Ladies Ontario Hockey Association (LOHA) was a women's ice hockey association in Ontario, Canada. It was founded in 1922, but faded during the Great Depression, as ice time for women's teams became rare and the number of member teams significantly decreased.

== History ==
In the early 1920s, working class women sought increased control over the administration and organizational aspects of the sports they played, including ice hockey. On December 16, 1922, a meeting was held to announce the Ladies Ontario Hockey Association was formed.

The organization was structured similarly to the Ontario Women's Softball Association in which women would run the organization but men would serve in an advisory capacity. During the December 16 meeting, Frank McEwen, president of the Toronto Hockey League, presided over the meeting. Members from ladies clubs in London, Ontario, and St. Thomas, Ontario, were present. There was a total of 20 teams in attendance. A letter from the Ottawa Alerts ladies club was presented, indicating their interest to join.

The women who become the executives of the LOHA in its first year were Mae Maxwell (First Vice President), Winnie Simpson (Second Vice President), Janet Allen (Treasurer), Kathleen Milne and E Harrison were members at large. John DeGruchy was its honorary president while Frank Best was its president. By December 23, 18 teams joined the LOHA and paid dues of eleven dollars for each team. In its first year, the LOHA associated with the Ontario branch of the Amateur Athletic Union of Canada. In 1923, Janet Allen was the first female to be elected LOHA president.

In autumn of 1923, the LOHA suffered a setback when the Canadian Amateur Hockey Association held a meeting in Port Arthur. The Association voted not to give women official recognition as hockey players.

In 1927, LOHA president Janet Allen and LOHA treasurer Bobbie Rosenfeld attended the 38th meeting of the men's hockey association, the Ontario Hockey Association (OHA), and asked the OHA to help endorse the league. In the process, they announced that if the OHA would help boost its membership, the LOHA would create a provincial championship for its member teams.

By 1934, the impact of the Great Depression was felt as the LOHA only had seven member teams, only one of which was from the city of Toronto. By late 1936, Bobbie Rosenfeld was not only the LOHA president, but served as the secretary and the treasurer.

Due to the Great Depression, ice time became extremely rare, especially for women. In March 1938, the LOHA semi-final with the Preston Rivulettes and the Northern Marvels of Cobalt had to be rescheduled. The game was scheduled to be played in Preston, but the OHA forced a change in venue so that a men's game could be played.

== List of presidents ==
Years	President
1922-23	Frank Best
1923-27	Janet Allen
1927-34	E Ruttier
1934-39	Bobbie Rosenfeld
1939-40	Roxy Atkins
